= Lean dynamics =

Business management practice

Lean dynamics is a business management practice that emphasizes the same primary outcome as lean manufacturing or lean production of eliminating wasteful expenditure of resources. However, it is distinguished by its different focus of creating a structure for accommodating the dynamic business conditions that cause these wastes to accumulate in the first place.

Like lean manufacturing, lean dynamics is a variation on the theme of creating efficiencies and greater value by optimizing flow rather than by maximizing economies of scale. As such, it represents an important chapter in the broader discussion of Taylorism, Fordisim, Alfred Sloan's standard volume methodology, Peter Drucker's philosophy on the "theory of the business" and Genichi Taguchi's analysis of loss. Its general philosophy has grown in popularity over recent years, in large part because of the increasingly challenging circumstances faced by the global business world (particularly evident during the 2008–2009 worldwide economic downturn.)

The need to create greater efficiencies while competing in an environment of change and innovation has been cited as a reason for the emergence of lean dynamics as a business improvement approach.

== Overview ==
The term "lean" was first coined by a researcher at MIT and later popularized by the best-selling book, The Machine that Changed the World (1990). Those implementing lean principles generally focus on applying lean tools which have been described in a number of references over the past two decades with the focus of seeking out and directly targeting "waste" (its seven forms described by Taiichi Ohno in his book Toyota Production System are well known.) This emphasis can result in greater efficiencies that do not necessarily respond well when business conditions shift.

Lean dynamics takes a different approach. Introduced by the book, Going Lean, it does not directly target the desired outcome of waste elimination; instead, it focuses on identifying and addressing sources of "lag", or imbedded disconnects in flowing value through operations, decision-making, information, and innovation that lead to workarounds and amplify disruption when business conditions change. It promotes a different way of structuring the business that creates an inherent "dynamic stability" or greater responsiveness for accommodating shifting business conditions. Companies that are structured in this way show dramatically greater customer value as measured by their quality, innovation, and customer satisfaction; they also sustain greater corporate value as measured by profitability, market capitalization, and growth.

Lean dynamics uses the value curve as a data-driven way of directly comparing companies to distinguish lean firms from other industries.

Implementation of lean dynamics focuses on driving down the impact that variation has on loss (based on the loss function from the Taguchi methods often described by the famous business statistician W. Edwards Deming), a concept describing the dramatic reduction of value-creating capabilities that traditional management systems display when subjected to sudden shifts in product demand, energy prices, or other conditions that affect operational stability or predictability.

Lean dynamics is particularly versatile in that it can be applied to a wide range of manufacturing and service industries. Its methods have been studied for Aerospace and Defense (particularly as applied to procuring hard to get spare parts), and medical, and distinguishes the few that stand out during crisis such as airlines, and retail.

== Background ==
Lean dynamics has its roots in a global study of lean manufacturing in the aerospace industry aimed at understanding how to break its cycle of cost escalation that was making new products unaffordable. These results were described in the Shingo Prize winning book, Breaking the Cost Barrier. This study showed that directly targeting “waste” reduction as the focal point for lean programs does not lead to significant cost savings. Instead, it provided strong evidence that emphasis should be placed on applying lean principles to mitigate the amplification of variation that causes workarounds. Addressing this variation was critical to overcoming the disruption that often causes waste to accumulate in the first place. Other sources cited this, identifying occurrences across other industries.

Subsequent research of the aerospace industry showed that firms had accepted these findings, describing this approach of Variation Management as "...one of the most prominent approaches to transforming and improving military enterprise performance."

This phenomenon was validated by correlating the disruption caused by variation in flow (measured as cycle time variation) with "loss" as described by the Taguchi Loss Function (see Taguchi Methods). Sudden changes in business conditions, such as spikes or decreases in production demand, cause increases in variation from forecasted conditions, causing disruption, and causing waste to accumulate. A lean dynamics approach restructures the way operations, organizations, information, and innovation are structured to overcome this.

One method for companies to deal internally with externally driven variation (such as sudden spikes in demand), a core tenet of lean dynamics, was explored by the Defense Department under the Supplier Utilization through Responsive Grouped Enterprises (SURGE) Program. The SURGE program was partially sponsored by the Joint Strike Fighter Program (JSF)(F-35 Lightning II) This program aimed to reduce factory disruption due to demand variation by grouping parts together that shared similar manufacturing processes. It succeeded in reducing lead time on a number of critical aerospace items by as much as 60%. The SURGE program gained notoriety when it was mentioned on the popular TV Show JAG.

== See also ==
- Taguchi loss function
- Six Sigma
- Statistical process control

=== Terminology ===
- Production leveling
- Muda, Mura, Muri
- Workcell
- Cycle time variation
