= The Toyota Way =

Set of managerial and production principles

The Toyota Way is a set of principles defining the organizational culture of Toyota Motor Corporation. The company formalized the Toyota Way in 2001, after decades of academic research into the Toyota Production System and its implications for lean manufacturing as a methodology that other organizations could adopt. The two pillars of the Toyota Way are respect for people and continuous improvement. Jeffrey K. Liker popularized the philosophy in his 2004 book, The Toyota Way: 14 Management Principles from the World's Greatest Manufacturer. Subsequent research has explored the extent to which the Toyota Way can be applied in other contexts.

== Background ==
The principles were first collated into a single document in the company's pamphlet "The Toyota Way 2001", to help codify the company's organizational culture. The philosophy was subsequently analyzed in the 2004 book The Toyota Way by American industrial engineering researcher Jeffrey Liker and has received attention in business administration education and corporate governance.

== Principles ==
The principles of the Toyota Way are divided into the two broad categories of continuous improvement and respect for human resources.

The standards for constant improvement include directives to set up a long-term vision, to engage in a step-by-step approach to challenges, to search for the root causes of problems, and to engage in ongoing innovation.

The standards pertain to respect for individuals and incorporate ways of building appreciation and cooperation.

The system is summarized in 14 principles:

No.	Principle	Explanation	Japanese philosophy terms
1	"Base your management decisions on a long-term philosophy, even at the expense of short-term financial goals."		
2	"Create a continuous process flow to bring problems to the surface."	Work processes are redesigned to eliminate waste, such as overproduction and waiting times, through continuous improvement	Muda, kaizen
3	"Use 'pull' systems to avoid overproduction."	A pull system produces only the required material after a subsequent operation signals a need.	
4	"Level out the workload. (Work like the tortoise, not the hare.)"	This principle aims to avoid overburdening people or equipment and creating uneven production levels.	Heijunka, mura
5	"Build a culture of stopping to fix problems, to get quality right the first time."	Quality takes precedence. Any employee can stop the process to signal a quality issue.	Jidoka
6	"Standardized tasks and processes are the foundation for continuous improvement and employee empowerment."		
7	"Use visual control so no problems are hidden."	This principle includes the 5S Program, steps that are used to make all workspaces efficient and productive, help people share workstations, reduce time looking for needed tools, and improve the work environment.	
8	"Use only reliable, thoroughly tested technology that serves your people and processes."		
9	"Grow leaders who thoroughly understand the work, live the philosophy, and teach it to others."	This principle argues that training and ingrained perspective are necessary for maintaining the organization.	
10	"Develop exceptional people and teams who follow your company's philosophy."		
11	"Respect your extended network of partners and suppliers by challenging them and helping them improve."	The automaker intends to apply the same principles to suppliers that its employees use.	
12	"Go and see for yourself to thoroughly understand the situation."	Toyota managers are expected to experience operations firsthand to see how they can be improved.	Genchi genbutsu
13	"Make decisions slowly by consensus, thoroughly considering all options; implement decisions rapidly."		Nemawashi
14	"Become a learning organization through relentless reflection and continuous improvement."	The general problem-solving technique to determine the root cause of a problem includes initial problem perception, clarification of the trouble, locating the cause, root cause analysis, applying countermeasures, reevaluating, and standardizing.	Hansei, Kaizen

== Research findings ==
In 2004, Jeffrey Liker, a University of Michigan professor of industrial engineering, published The Toyota Way. In his book, Liker calls the Toyota Way "a system designed to provide the tools for people to continually improve their work."

According to Liker, the 14 principles of The Toyota Way are organized into four sections:

1. long-term philosophy,
2. the right process will produce the right results,
3. add value to the organization by developing your people, and
4. continuously solving root problems drives organizational learning.

=== Long-term philosophy ===
The first principle involves managing with a long-term view rather than for short-term gain. It reflects a belief that people need a purpose to find motivation and establish goals.

=== Right process will produce right results ===
The following seven principles are focused on process with an eye towards a quality outcome. Following these principles, work processes are redesigned to eliminate waste (muda) through continuous improvement — kaizen.

The seven types of muda are:

1. Overproduction
2. Waiting, time on hand
3. Unnecessary transport or conveyance
4. Overprocessing or incorrect processing
5. Excess inventory
6. Motion
7. Defects

The principles in this section empower employees despite the automaker's bureaucratic processes.

Any employee in the Toyota Production System has the authority to stop production to signal a quality issue, emphasizing that quality takes precedence (jidoka).

The way the Toyota bureaucratic system is implemented allows for continuous improvement (kaizen) from the people affected by that system so that any employee may aid in the growth and improvement of the company.

Recognition of the value of employees is also part of the principle of measured production rate (heijunka), as a level workload helps avoid overburdening people and equipment (muri), but this is also intended to minimize waste (muda) and avoid uneven production levels (mura).

These principles are also designed to ensure that only essential materials are employed (to avoid overproduction), that the work environment is maintained efficiently (the 5S Program) to help people share workstations and to reduce time looking for needed tools, and that the technology used is reliable and thoroughly tested.

The concept of "standardized work" has been extended to managers referring to "standardized work for (executive) leadership" (or Leader Standard Work), looking at elements such as

- Definition of leadership that satisfies the needs of internal and external customers
- A precise description of business principles that leaders use to perform their work
- A standard skill set to keep business processes operating smoothly

=== Value to organization by developing people ===
Human development is the focus of principles 9 through 11.

Principle 9 emphasizes the need to ensure that leaders embrace and promote the corporate philosophy. According to Liker, this reflects a belief that these principles must be ingrained in employees to survive.

Principle 10 emphasizes the need for individuals and work teams to embrace the company's philosophy, with teams of 4-5 people who are judged in success by their team achievements, rather than their solo efforts.

Principle 11 looks to business partners, who are treated by Toyota much like they treat their employees. Toyota challenges them to do better and helps them achieve it.

The automaker provides cross-functional teams to help suppliers discover and fix problems to become more robust, better suppliers.

=== Solving root problems drives organizational learning ===
The final principles embrace a philosophy of problem-solving that emphasizes thorough understanding, swiftly implemented consensus-based solutions, continual reflection (hansei), and improvement (kaizen).

Principle 12 (genchi genbutsu) sets out the expectation that managers will personally evaluate operations to understand situations and problems firsthand.

Principle 13 encourages thorough consideration of possible solutions through a consensus process, with rapid implementation of decisions once reached (nemawashi).

The final principle requires that Toyota be a "learning organization", continually reflecting on its practices and striving for improvement. According to Liker, becoming a learning organization involves criticizing every aspect of what one does.

== Implementation ==
=== Translating the principles ===
There is a question of uptake of the principles now that Toyota has production operations in many countries.

While the corporate culture may have been quickly disseminated by word of mouth when Toyota manufacturing was only in Japan, with worldwide production, many different cultures must be taken into account.

Concepts such as "mutual ownership of problems", or "genchi genbutsu", (solving problems at the source instead of behind desks), and the "kaizen mind", (an unending sense of crisis behind the company's constant drive to improve), may be unfamiliar to North Americans and people of other cultures.

The automaker's increase in vehicle recalls may be due, in part, to "a failure by Toyota to spread its obsession for craftsmanship among its growing ranks of overseas factory workers and managers."

Toyota is attempting to address these needs by establishing training institutes in the United States and Thailand.

=== Cultural influence in the company ===
The Toyota Way has forms part of the company's culture.

According to Masaki Saruta, author of several books on Toyota:

the real Toyota Way is a culture of control.

A management consultancy perspective of the Toyota Way,

was not only the value of teaching and training their entire workforce to continuously improve their jobs, but also the power of entrusting the entire workforce to do so to the betterment of all.

The Toyota Way emphasizes strong company loyalty, which may also limit the voice of those who challenge authority.

The Toyota Way of constructive criticism to reach a better way of doing things "is not always received in good spirit at home."

The Toyota Way management approach at the automaker "worked until it didn't."

One consequence was when Toyota was given reports of sudden acceleration in its vehicles, and the company faced an expensive recall situation. There were questions if Toyota's crisis was caused by the company losing sight of its principles.

The Toyota Way did not address the problem and provide direction on what the automaker would be doing. Instead, managers protected the company. They issued flat-out denials and placed the blame on others.

The consequence of the automaker's actions led to the 2009–11 Toyota vehicle recalls.

Although one of the Toyota Way principles is to "build a culture of stopping to fix problems to get quality right the first time", Akio Toyoda, President and CEO, stated during Congressional hearings that the reason for the problems was that his "company grew too fast." Toyota management had determined its goal was to become the world's largest automotive manufacturer.

According to some management consultants, when the pursuit of growth took priority, the automaker "lost sight of the key values that gave it its reputation in the first place."

== See also ==
- Kanban: just-in-time workflow management system at Toyota
