= Fixed repeating schedule =

Fixed repeating schedule is a key element of the Toyota Production System and lean manufacturing. As its name suggests it is a production schedule which is 'unchanging' and repeated perhaps daily or over a longer period such as two weeks or month. If it can be implemented, economies of repetition start to become evident and suppliers and customers can be assured in their own activity scheduling. What impedes this being implemented is the uncertainty of demand and supply. Therefore whilst the scheduling becomes simple, the activities to make the scheduling possible become more complex. Thus the planning to move to FRS reveals issues which, if managed correctly, will reduce complexity overall and improve customer service.

== History ==
Fixed repeating schedules have been invented all over the place by many organisations as local solutions. Perhaps Ford's early production technique was a trivial example since by ensuring only one product, the black model T, the scheduling became simple as well.

The first widely publicised example with a systematic development was in the Toyota Production System where an FRS smooths flow in the factory and therefore reduces the waste of unevenness (or mura).

== Implementation ==
=== Step 1: red stream/green stream ===
Since in all but the trivial example of constant demand there will actually be fluctuations in required production, FRS is only part of a scheduling solution. The challenge in the early steps of implementation is to isolate the maximum part of production that can be fixed from the part of production that cannot. This isolation, at least in the early stages, should extend to the supporting services as well as the value adding process or gemba itself. Thus procurement, stock keeping, deliveries and so on should be run separately for the fixed and non-fixed schedules. For example, this means two procurement 'contracts'; one for fixed deliveries of fixed amounts at regular intervals and one for deliveries as otherwise requested. If this disciple in not complete then the uncertainties in the unfixed side will 'leak' back into the fixed side which will then become unfixed for lack of resources.

To enforce this separation some factories have actually split the factory into two different parts with each part being represented and painted a different colour. This separation went as far as painting forklift trucks, tools, floor areas and stock containers in their corresponding colour as well as selecting staff based upon their temperament to work on one side or the other. The German factory director believed it was as close as he could come to actually running two factories, one FRS and the other flexible.

The benefit of this work was the significant cost decreases that occurred in the FRS 'factory' which far outweighed the slight increase in costs in the flexible 'factory'. In the FRS 'factory' all costs and activities will be repeated which allows significant process simplifications and time and cost reductions to occur across all functions. This is because the 'exceptions' to the standard process will no longer occur and schedules will always be achieved so that process failure 'safety net' processes and equipment and staff can be eliminated or re-deployed.

These benefits only accrue whilst the green stream/FRS products or services remain predictable in demand. Therefore it is critical to ensure appropriate frequency reviews of product demand to ensure promotion of stable products from the red stream and demotion of now less stable demand products to the red stream. This may follow product maturity curves where, after initial introduction, when demand stabilises products move into the FRS and then later, when purchase enthusiasm wanes, they are removed again. Seasonality can be built into FRS by having, for example, a summer and a winter fixed schedule.

=== Step 2: speed up the FRS ===
The implementation of step 1 will have allowed people in the 'FRS' factory to run simpler processes and to establish routines that were not possible in the schedule, reschedule, reschedule world that existed before, and may still exist in the 'non-FRS factory'. This will make the work more manageable and simplify the communications in the 'factory' that are so critical to performance. Because of this it will become much clearer what sub-processes are limiting production capability and therefore which operations can be simplified and improved. It is often the case that large stock levels pre-existed, or were built to make FRS 'possible', the actual causes of these stocks can now be addressed by operational improvements to reduce lot sizes and improve reliability. Once these have been done and supporting services have also adjusted then the aim is to shorten the period of the repeat in 'FRS'. This planning and then action will surface new issues along the lines of the earlier phase which should in their turn be managed as a priority. The shortening of the cycle will allow the reduction of finished goods and WIP stocks as well whilst maintaining availability of stocks for customers. This cycle should be repeated until management nerve breaks.

For Toyota the implementation of a fixed repeating schedule is one of the early steps in achieving production levelling which follows further steps to achieve lower lot sizes gain the lower costs and flexibility this makes possible.
