= Lean project management =

Management framework

Lean project management is the application of lean concepts such as lean construction, lean manufacturing and lean thinking to project management.

Lean project management has many ideas in common with other lean concepts; however, the main principle of lean project management is delivering more value with less waste in a project context.

Lean Project Management applies the five principles of lean thinking to project management.

"Lean" is a systematic method for the elimination of waste ("Muda") within a manufacturing system. Lean also takes into account waste created through overburden ("Muri") and waste created through unevenness in work loads ("Mura"). Working from the perspective of the client who consumes a product or service, "value" is any action or process that a customer would be willing to pay for.

Lean approach makes obvious what adds value by reducing everything else which does not add value. This management philosophy is derived mostly from the Toyota Production System (TPS) and identified as "lean" only in the 1990s. TPS is renowned for its focus on reduction of the original Toyota seven wastes to improve overall customer value, but there are varying perspectives on how this is best achieved. The steady growth of Toyota, from a small company to the world's largest automaker, has focused attention on how it has achieved this success.

The term "Lean Project Management" has not been picked up by any of the international organizations developing Project Management Standards: The ISO Standard ISO 21502:2020 refers to term "agile", which may be understood as a similar concept, as a delivery approach of products (project scope), and the PMBOK Standard published by the Project Management Institute refers to an "adaptive" type of development lifecycle also called "agile" or "change-driven" with regard to the product development lifecycle of a project (an element of the project lifecycle).

== Types ==
In general, a project can be said to be Lean if it applies the principles of lean thinking. There are, however, different implementations of this idea that don't necessarily apply all of the principles with equal weight.

Two well-known types are "Kanban" and "Last Planner System".

The term Kanban comes from manufacturing but was adapted for software development by David Anderson when he was working at Microsoft in 2005 and inherited an underperforming maintenance team. The success of the approach in that environment, led Anderson to experiment with Kanban in projects, with similarly positive results. As Anderson publicised his findings through talks and his book, software developers began to experiment with Kanban and it is now one of the most widely used methods for managing agile software development projects.

The Last Planner System is used principally in construction and particularly focuses on pull and flow but perhaps more important than those is its emphasis on a collaborative approach in which all trades work together to create a visual representation of the work that needs to be done.

== Related concepts ==
- Lean product development
- Lean startup
- Lean construction
- Kanban (development)
- Lean software development
- Agile software development
- Agile management
