= Kaikaku =

Japanese term for "radical change"

Kaikaku (改革), is the Japanese term for "radical change". In business, kaikaku is concerned with making fundamental and radical changes to a production system, unlike kaizen which is focused on incremental changes.

== Kaikaku vs kaizen ==
Kaikaku and kaizen are concepts in Japanese production philosophy that relate to each other. Both have origins in the Toyota Production System and can be applied to activities other than production.

Kaikaku means a radical change, during a limited time, of a production system. Kaizen, on the other hand, is a system of incremental production system changes, often with the primary goal of solving team-related problems. Kaizen is based on the involvement of all employees, wherein singular changes typically do not improve major production metrics above a 20% threshold. A cross between kaikaku and kaizen is kaizen blitz (or kaizen events), which targets a radical improvement in a limited area, such as a production cell, typically during an intense week.

A crucial distinction between kaikaku and kaizen is that kaikaku as a process is willing to wholly overturn or replace current systems of production, instead of incrementally improving it, which can keep production at contemporary rates. "By focusing exclusively on small improvements, an organization may miss an opportunity to gain a competitive advantage in costs and customer service. If competitors take a big leap, an organization will be left behind, still making candles in a light bulb market."

== Elements of kaikaku ==
Kaikaku means that an entire business is changed radically, typically in the form of a project. Kaikaku is most often initiated by management, since the implementation and the result will significantly impact business. Kaikaku is about introducing new knowledge, new strategies, new approaches, new production techniques or new equipment. Kaikaku can be initiated through an observational process of "analyzing the current status quo, identifying the production strategy, formulate the desired future state of production, transition, and manage and improve the transformed system." Kaikaku can be prompted by external factors, e.g. new technology or market conditions. Kaikaku can also be initiated when management judges that diminishing improvements from ongoing Kaizen efforts suggest a need for more radical change. Kaikaku projects often result in improvements in the range of 30-50% and a new base level for continued kaizen. Kaikaku may also be called System Kaizen.

=== Process characteristics ===
- It is triggered from many points such as strategic developments, business goals, and customer requests.
- Results in medium or long term, average 120 days (min: 60 days, max: 180 days),
- Its effects are seen in the long term,
- It consists of interrelated and complex situations,
- Advanced analysis and statistical techniques are used,
- It is coordinated by a core team and the team consists of experts also.

Kaikaku projects can be of four different types:

- Locally innovative implementation - e.g., introducing a production robot, well-known to the industry, but new to the company
- Locally innovative methodology - e.g., introducing Six Sigma or TPM methods, well-known to the industry, but new to the company
- Globally innovative implementation - e.g., introducing a new robot design to the industry
- Globally innovative methodology - e.g., introducing a new production theory to the industry

== See also ==
- Kaizen
- Pivot (lean startup)
- Lean hospital
- Toyota Way
