= Training Within Industry =

Service for on the job training in industry

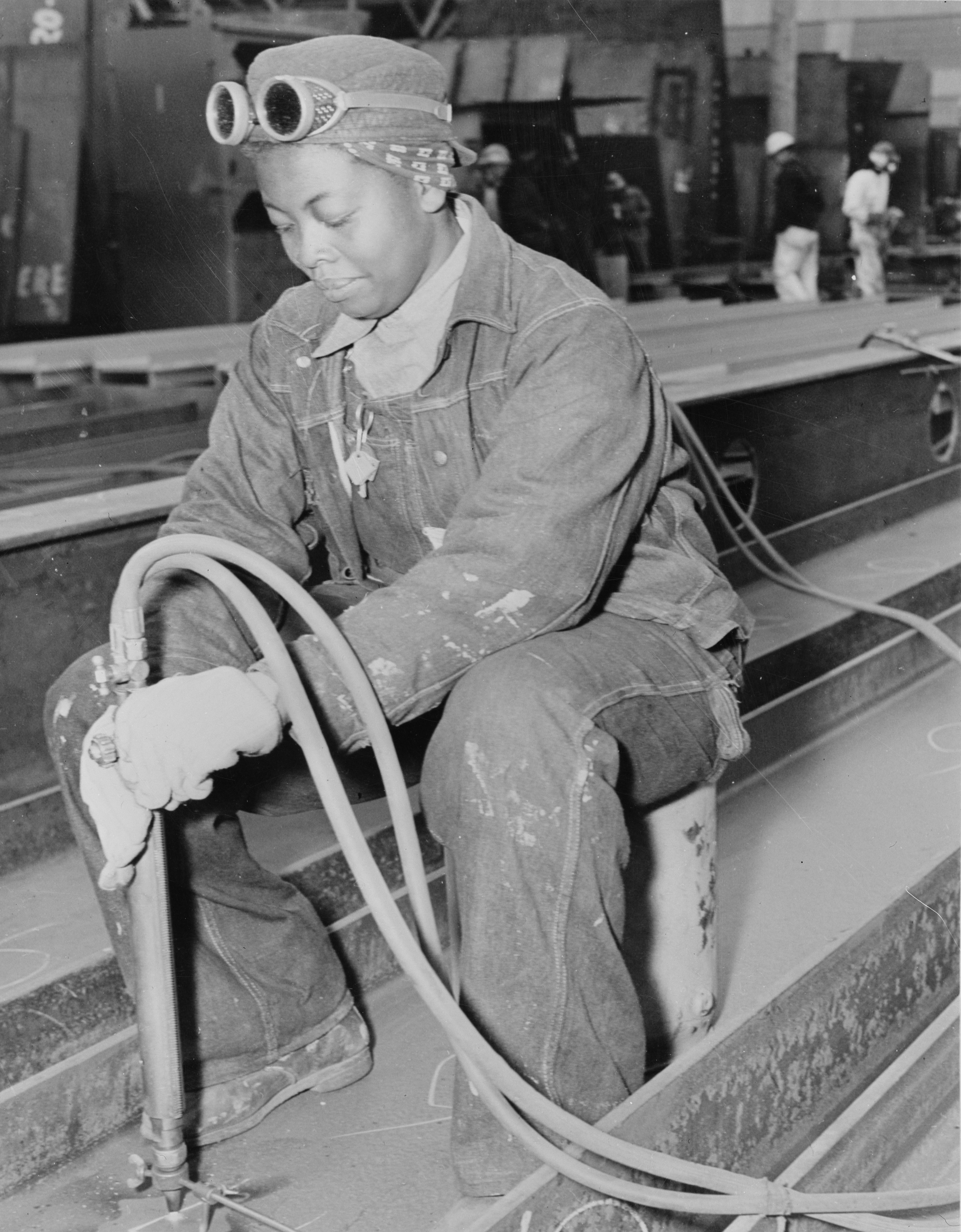
Captain at Richmond Shipyards

The Training Within Industry (TWI) service was created by the United States Department of War, running from 1940 to 1945 within the War Manpower Commission. The purpose was to provide consulting services to war-related industries whose personnel were being conscripted into the US Army at the same time the War Department was issuing orders for additional matériel. It was apparent that the shortage of trained and skilled personnel at precisely the time they were needed most would impose a hardship on those industries, and that only improved methods of job training would address the shortfall. By the end of World War II, over 1.6 million workers in over 16,500 plants had received a certification. The program continued post-war in Europe and Asia, where it aided reconstruction. It is most notable in the business world for inspiring the concept of kaizen in Japan. In addition, the program became the foundation of the Toyota Production System and the DoD resourced open source Management System (3.1).

== Overview ==
The four basic training programs (10-hour sessions) developed by TWI were developed by experts on loan from private industry. Because of the intensity of the situation, a large number of experimental methods were tried and discarded. This resulted in a distilled, concentrated set of programs. Each program had introductory programs called "Appreciation Sessions" that were used to sell the programs to top management and introduce the programs to middle management of a company. Each program also had 'Train-the-Trainer' programs and handbooks called "Institute Conductor's Manual" for the master trainers. The TWI Service also developed a number of "Staff Only" training programs to support staff development and to improve the implementation success.

The TWI trainers had to be invited to a factory in order to present their material. In order to market the service, they developed the Five Needs of the Supervisor: every supervisor needs to have Knowledge of the Work, Knowledge of Responsibility, Skill in Instructing, Skill in Improving Methods, and Skill in Leading. Each program was based on Charles Allen's 4-point method of Preparation, Presentation, Application, and Testing.

The 10-hour Sessions were:

- Job Instruction (JI) - a course that taught trainers (supervisors and experienced workers) to train inexperienced workers faster. The instructors were taught to break down jobs into closely defined steps, show the procedures while explaining the key points and the reasons for the key points, then watch the student attempt under close coaching, and finally to gradually wean the student from the coaching. The course emphasized the credo, "If the worker hasn't learned, the instructor hasn't taught". At the request of enterprises outside of manufacturing, variations to the JI program were developed for hospitals, office and farms.
- Job Methods (JM) - a course that taught workers to objectively evaluate the efficiency of their jobs and to methodically evaluate and suggest improvements. The course also worked with a job breakdown, but students were taught to analyze each step and determine if there were sufficient reason to continue to do it in that way by asking a series of pointed questions. If they determined some step could be done better by eliminating, combining, rearranging, or simplifying, they were to develop and apply the new method by selling it to the "boss" and co-workers, obtaining approval based on safety, quality, quantity, and cost, standardizing the new method, and giving credit.
- Job Relations (JR) - a course that taught supervisors to deal with workers effectively and fairly. It emphasized the lesson, "People Must Be Treated As Individuals".
- Program Development (PD) - the meta-course that taught those with responsibility for the training function to assist the line organization in solving production problems through training.

There was also a short-lived course that taught union personnel (UJR) to work effectively with management.

=== Additional programs ===
Internal training programs were; "Management Contact Manual" (1944) - a formal training course on how to sell the TWI programs to management, "How to get Continuing Results from TWI Programs in a Plant" (1944) - this training program was the out-growth of two years of practical experimentation and experience on what it took to have a successful implementation of TWI.

- Job Safety (JS) - While the US TWI Service chose to not develop a JS program, stating that safety was part of every job, Canada led the way with the first variant that was closely modeled on the JI program. This program was offered to England, which declined and developed a JS program that focused on discovery of risk and resolution. Copies of the British programs were circulated in Japan starting about 1948.
- Problem Solving (PS) - There are two different programs using similar names. The TWI Foundation released their PS program in 1946 and follows the standard J program format. TWI, Inc. released their program in 1955 and is a much more comprehensive program that revolves around using the JI, JR and JM programs for problem solving.
- Discussion Leading (DL) - This is an early work in developing what is now recognized as facilitation skills. TWIF also produced a variant of this program called Conference Leading.

=== Expansion to other nations ===
There were several groups that had an impact in the expansion of the TWI programs around the world - US State Department, US Army, British Ministry of Labour, International Labor Organization (ILO) and Standard Oil. In 1944, the British Ministry of Labour sent Frank Perkins to the US to evaluate the TWI programs. In the summer of 1944, Perkins returned to England to establish a similar program. The British Ministry of Labour actively promoted the TWI programs, listing 65 countries in addition to the US and England where TWI was known to be in use as of 1959. Expansion into Europe was led by Standard Oil, which led the translation efforts of the manuals into native languages. Some European TWI activity was done under the Marshall Plan by "Visiting Experts" (VE), with limited success. It was the later work by the ILO using the Standard Oil translations and re-translation efforts that established the TWI programs in Europe. The ILO TWI training program in Bangalore India has the distinction of training the first Japanese about 1947.

=== Post war ===
Although the TWI program funding for application of the programs in the USA by the government ended in 1945, the US government did fund the introduction to the war-torn nations of Europe and Asia. Several private groups continued to provide TWI in the US and abroad. Channing Dooley, Walter Dietz, Mike Kane and Bill Conover (collectively known as "the Four Horsemen") continued the development of the 'J' programs by establishing the TWI Foundation. This group was responsible for continuing the spread of TWI throughout Europe and Asia. The Director of one of the district offices established TWI, Inc., and was hired by the US Government to provide TWI training in Japan. It was especially well received in Japan, where TWI formed the basis of the kaizen culture in industry. Kaizen, known by such names as Quality Circles in the West, was successfully harnessed by Toyota Motor Corporation in conjunction with the Lean or Just In Time principles of Taiichi Ohno. In the foreword to Dinero's book "Training Within Industry", John Shook relates a story in which a Toyota trainer brought out an old copy of a TWI service manual to prove to him that American workers at NUMMI could be taught using the "Japanese" methods used at Toyota. Thus, TWI was the forerunner of what is today regarded as a Japanese creation.

=== TWI and Lean Management ===
The symbiosis between TWI program and Lean Management is such that one cannot effectively implement Lean Management without incorporating TWI principles. Lean Management's success largely depends on the competence and awareness of middle management, which TWI aims to develop. This focus on leadership skills, as emphasized in sources like Jeffrey Liker's "Toyota Talent" highlights TWI's pivotal role in shaping organizational culture in the context of Lean Management. The practical implementation of TWI Program within Lean Management underscores the program's enduring significance and its essential role in the successful transformation of middle management into effective leaders.

== See also ==
- Kaizen
- Lean Management
- Toyota Production System
- General MacArthur's Occupation of Japan
