= Digital project twin =

A digital project twin (or digital twin of the project) is a virtual equivalent of intangible assets and processes by using digits, particularly binary digits, around a temporary undertaking.

== Origins ==
The digital project twin evolved from the idea of the more general digital twin, which had historically been evolved from the aerospace industry. In the historical evolution, the conceptual foundation of a digital twin focusses primarily on physical environments that encompass a real object such as devices and machines with respective virtual environments. The concept of a digital twin has been utilized by other areas such as business services and product service systems; however there is no uniform accepted definition of digital twins. One requirement of a digital project twin is the representation of data from information systems around the product lifecycle management (PLM) with a focus from the formation idea through to the use phases.

== Concept ==
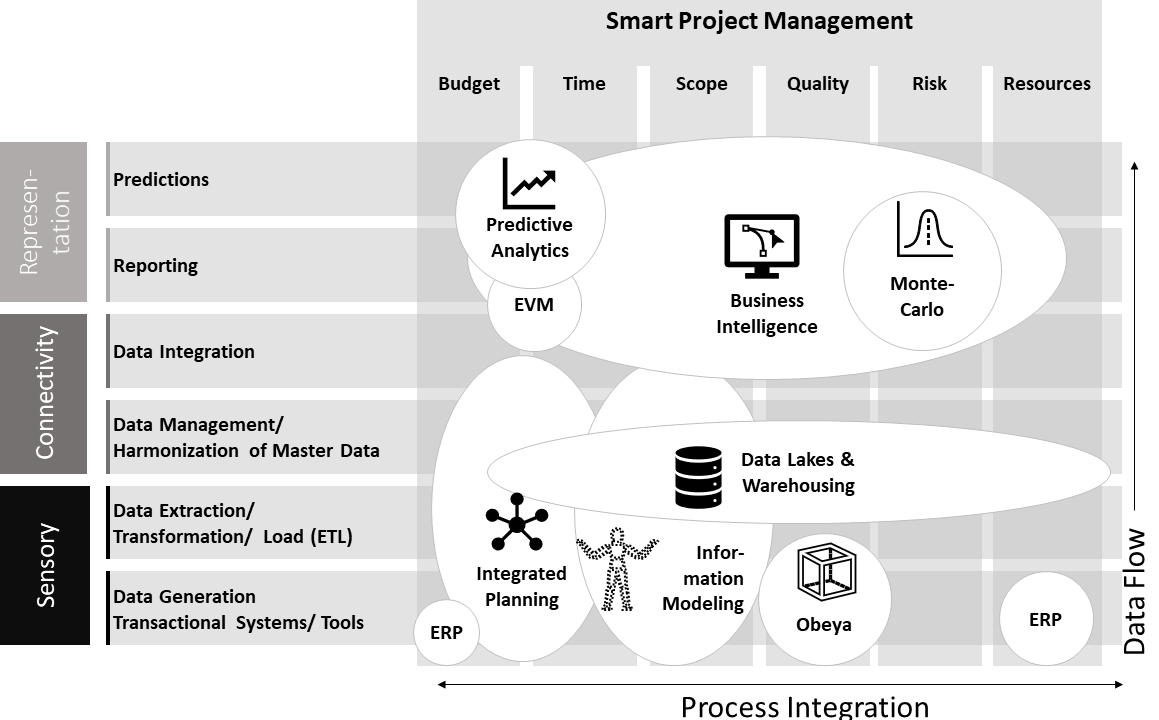
Field Matrix of the Concept of Digital Project Twin: Techniques within the circles are examples

A project is the realization of a unique and innovative deliverable and thus something performed to develop an object. One reason for project failures may be that potential project risks are insufficiently reflected in anticipations of project success (overconfidence effect). The purpose of a digital project twin is to improve the quality management, to avoid cost overruns and to prevent time escalations of projects. The backbone are data infrastructures and IT architecture. Early digital twin frameworks have already been developed with the aim to focus on smart project management. The field of digital project twins can be approached by combining the three distinct parts derived from digital/virtual products and adopted to a project environment: first: the project (physical sensory), second: connectivity of data and third: the virtual representation. Across this field, different techniques, methods, and underlying software solutions can be clustered. With an increase of maturity across the field (e.g., data sources, connections, and ways to visualize), a digital model (no automation) will evolve with a digital shadow (automatic data flow from the real project to its digital twin) to a digital twin (automatic data flow from the real project to its digital twin and vice versa).

=== Virtual project representation ===
Tactical decision making can not only prevent potential failure in advance, but also make sense of the working and staffing to adapt the process to changing conditions. Examples of techniques that can be used for a virtual representation of the project include earned value management (EVM) to calculate estimates of completion by considering budget and time. This is combined with predictive analytics to extrapolate historical data or Monte Carlo methods for simulations. Easy-to-use data analysis tools are often combined with real time reporting within business intelligence.

=== Data connectivity ===
A major requirement of digital project twins is to manage project data around the information system. Therefore, business warehousing and other technologies of business intelligence are required to manage data and to integrate connections with data from many different sources. The connectivity of data and how information is shared among organizations and individuals are key challenges. As is. If the aim of the digital project twin is the exhaustive capture of nearly all available parameter this may also include deeply personal data, such as feelings about the project. Thus, the question of data ownership is crucial to who accesses data and for what purpose.

=== Physical project sensory ===
Sensors work as data sources in a present project to create a virtual equivalent of it. Operational and financial data must be gathered from different sensors, which are operationalized through software that supports integrated planning, information modeling, or enterprise resource planning. Software for Kanban, Obeya or other components of lean management, in particular originated from the Toyota Production System, may also be useful examples to generate data of a project. Furthermore, event log data generated through data mining techniques has also been proven as useful.

== Specific use cases ==
Already established use cases for a digital project twin in research and practice are engineer to order and construction environments with a building information modeling (BIM). Innovations and techniques such as augmented reality, virtual reality, artificial intelligence, and additive manufacturing – also called 3D printing – are set to dominate the 'engineer to order' and the construction environments in the future. These techniques are deemed to be useful for product development projects in the mentioned industries. For example, the German Federal Ministry for Economic Affairs and Energy (German: Bundesministerium für Wirtschaft und Energie), abbreviated BMWi, funds the DigitalTWIN (Digital Tools and Workflow Integration for Building Lifecycles) project within the scope of the "Smart Service World II" program. According to the project website, "the aim is that an open platform architecture, more advanced broadband communication systems and computer vision technologies should simplify planning, production and coordination with the building site and provide users with a reliable, flexible and upgradable communication and management infrastructure."

== See also ==
- Project management software
- Project planning
- Cost overrun
- List of failed and overbudget custom software projects
