= Genchi =

Genchi may refer to:

- Genchi Genbutsu, the key principle of the Toyota Production System
- Jean Genchi (born 1956), British rower
