= Genchi genbutsu =

Toyota Production System principle

Genchi genbutsu (現地現物) literally "real location, real thing” (meaning "the situation onsite"). It is a key principle of the Toyota Production System. The principle is sometimes referred to as "go and see." It suggests that in order to truly understand a situation one needs to observe what is happening at the site where work actually takes place: the gemba (現場). One definition is that it is "collecting facts and data at the actual site of the work or problem."

== Application ==
Taiichi Ohno, creator of the Toyota Production System is credited, perhaps apocryphally, with taking new graduates to the shop floor and drawing a chalk circle on the floor. The graduate would be told to stand in the circle, observe and note what he saw. When Ohno returned he would check; if the graduate had not seen enough he would be asked to keep observing. Ohno was trying to imprint upon his future engineers that the only way to truly understand what happens on the shop floor was to go there. It was where the value was added and waste could be observed.

Genchi genbutsu is, therefore, a key approach in problem-solving, saying that if the problem exists on the shop floor, then it needs to be understood and solved at the shop floor.

Genchi genbutsu is also called Gemba attitude. Gemba is the Japanese term for "the place" (meaning "the place where it actually happens"). Since real value is created at the shop floor in manufacturing, Gemba highlights that the shop floor is where managers need to spend their time.

Genchi genbutsu is sometimes referred to as "Getcha boots on" (and go out and see what is happening) in English due to its similar cadence and meaning. It has been compared to Peters and Waterman's idea of "Management By Wandering Around". This concept quickly became so universal that new managers instinctively knew that they had to "walk around" to achieve high effectiveness levels. Whilst these ideas, with their associated lists of how-tos, are probably good ideas they may miss the essential nature of Genchi Genbutsu which is less to "visit" and more to "know" by being there. Toyota has high levels of management presence on the production line whose role is to "know" and to constantly improve.

== See also ==
- Contextual inquiry
- Field research
- In situ
- Off the verandah
- Participant observation
- User-centered design
- User experience
- User experience design
- User research
