= Command center =

Place used to provide centralized command

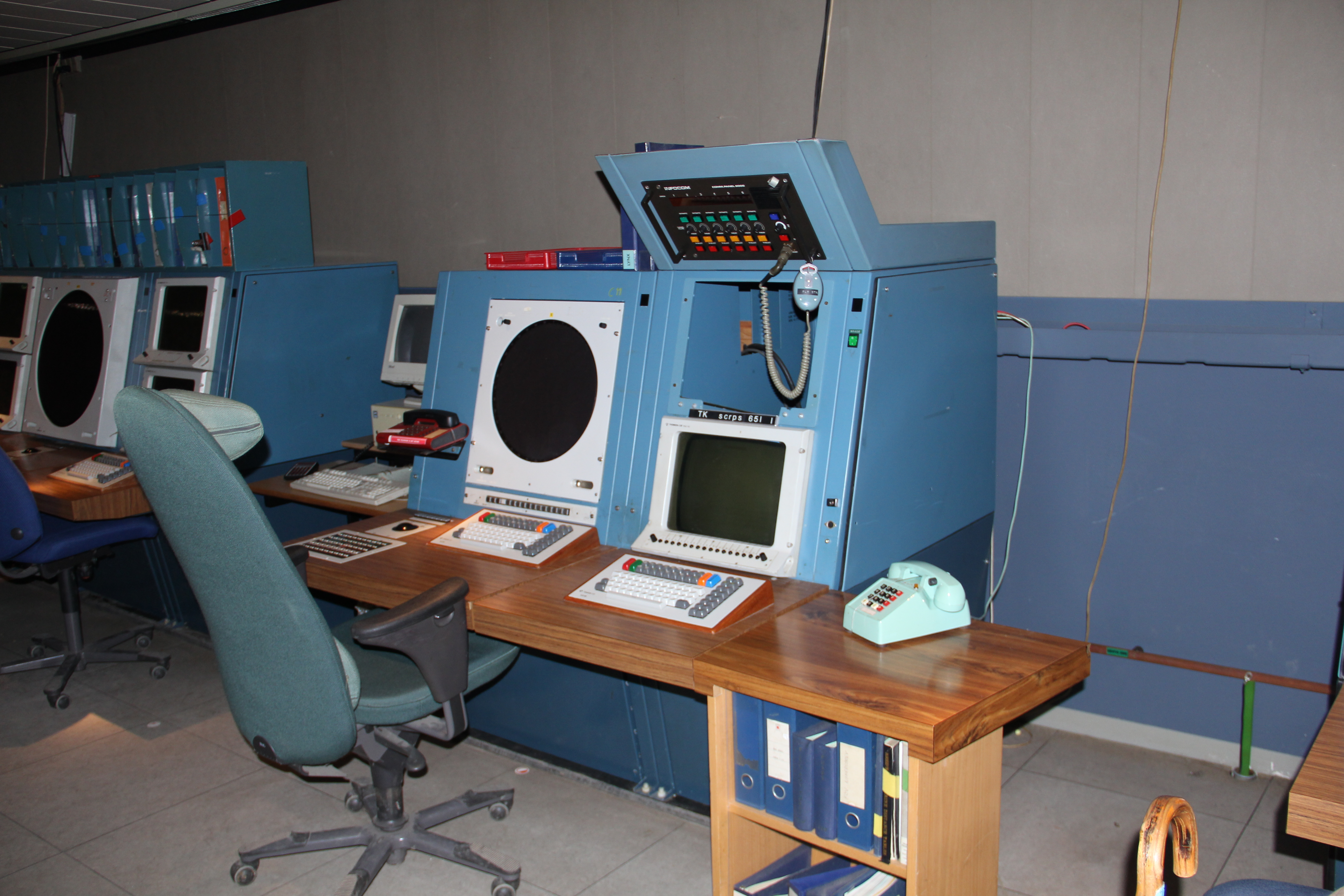
War room at Stevns Fortress used in Denmark during the Cold War

A command center (often called a war room) is any place that is used to provide centralized command for some purpose.

While frequently considered to be a military facility, these can be used in many other cases by governments or businesses. The term "war room" is also often used in politics to refer to teams of communications people who monitor and listen to the media and the public, respond to inquiries, and synthesize opinions to determine the best course of action.

If all functions of a command center are located in a single room this is often referred to as a control room. However in business management teams, the term "war room" is still frequently used, especially when the team is focusing on the necessary strategy and tactics to accomplish some goal the business finds important. The war room in many cases is different than a command center because one may be formed to deal with a particular crisis such as sudden unfavorable media, and the war room is convened in order to brainstorm ways to deal with it. A large corporation can have several war rooms to deal with different goals or crises.

A command center enables an organization to function as designed, to perform day-to-day operations regardless of what is happening around it, in a manner in which no one realizes it is there but everyone knows who is in charge when there is trouble.

Conceptually, a command center is a source of leadership and guidance to ensure that service and order is maintained, rather than an information center or help desk. Its tasks are achieved by monitoring the environment and reacting to events, from the relatively harmless to a major crisis, using predefined procedures.

== Types of command centers ==
There are many types of command centers. They include:

Data center management
Oversees the central management and operating control for the computer systems that are essential most businesses, usually housed in data centers and large computer rooms.
Business application management
Ensures applications that are critical to customers and businesses are always available and working as designed.
Civil management
Oversees the central management and control of civil operational functions. Staff members in those centers monitor the metropolitan environment to ensure the safety of people and the proper operation of critical government services, adjusting services as required and ensuring proper constant movement.
Emergency (crisis) management
Directs people, resources, and information, and controls events to avert a crisis/emergency and minimize/avoid impacts should an incident occur.

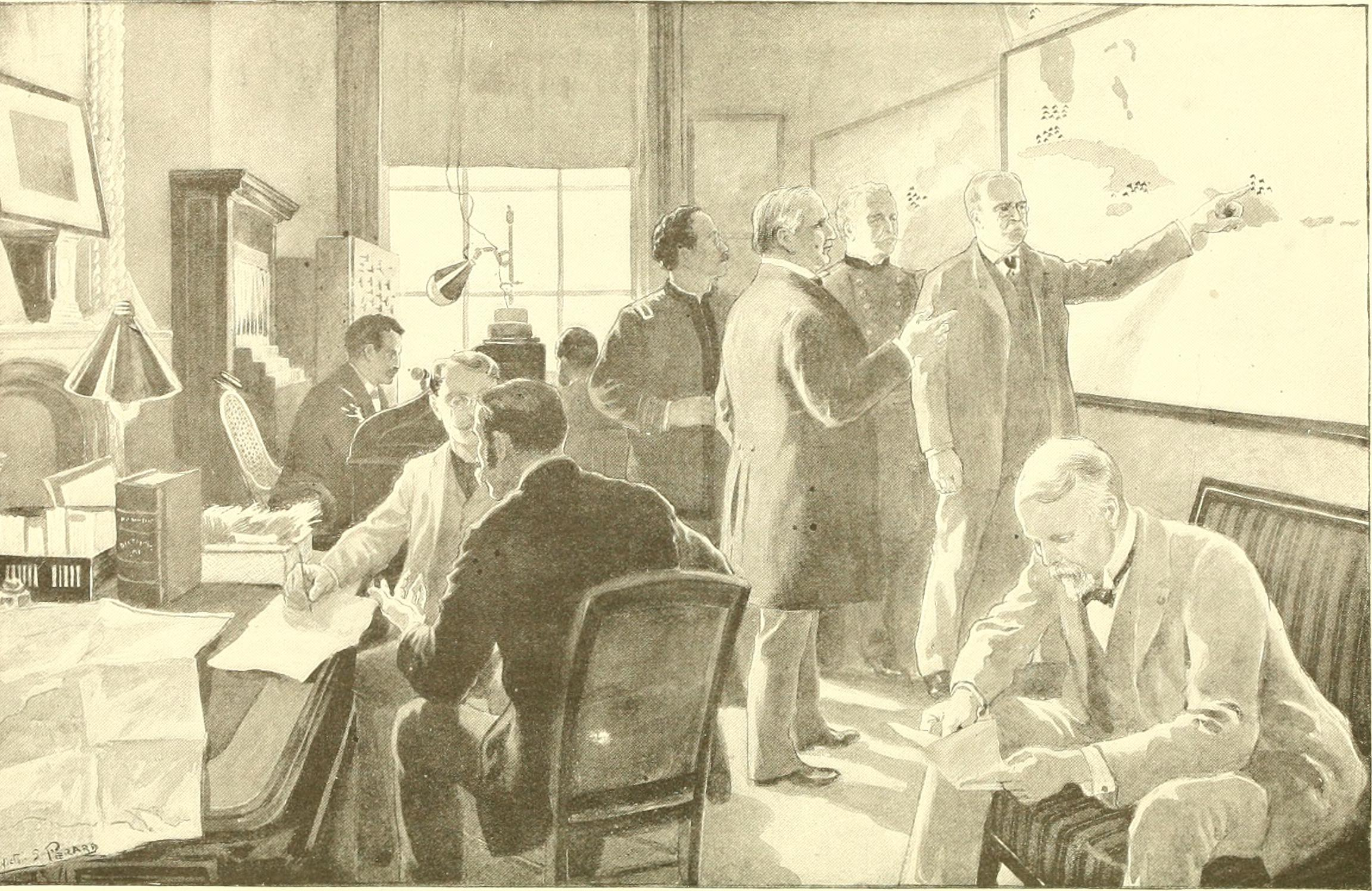
19th century War Room of the United States Navy

=== Types of command and control rooms and their responsibilities ===
- Command Center (CC or ICC)
  - Data center, computer system, incident response
- Network Operation Centers (NOC)
  - Network equipment and activity
- Tactical Operation Centers (TOC)
  - Military operations
  - Police and intelligence
- Security Operation Centers (SOC)
  - Security agencies
  - Government agencies
  - Traffic management
  - CCTV
- Emergency Operation Centers (EOC)
  - Emergency services
- Combined Operation Centers (COS)
  - Air traffic control
  - Oil and gas
  - Control rooms
  - Broadcast
- Audio Visual (AV)
  - Simulation and training
  - Medical
- Social Media Command Center
  - Monitoring, posting and responding on social media sites

== Military and government ==
A command center is a central place for carrying out orders and for supervising tasks, also known as a headquarters, or HQ.

Common to every command center are three general activities: inputs, processes, and outputs. The inbound aspect is communications (usually intelligence and other field reports). Inbound elements are "sitreps" (situation reports of what is happening) and "progreps" (progress reports relative to a goal that has been set) from the field back to the command element.

The process aspect involves a command element that makes decisions about what should be done about the input data. In the US military, the command consists of a field – (Major to Colonel) or flag – (General) grade commissioned officer with one or more advisers. The outbound communications then delivers command decisions (i.e., operating orders) to the field elements.

Command centers should not be confused with the high-level military formation of a Command – as with any formation, Commands may be controlled from a command center, however not all formations controlled from a command centre are Commands.

=== Examples ===
==== Canada ====
During the Cold War, the Government of Canada undertook the construction of "Emergency Government Headquarters", to be used in the event of nuclear warfare or other large-scale disaster. Canada was generally allied with the United States for the duration of the war, was a founding member of NATO, allowed American cruise missiles to be tested in the far north, and flew sovereignty missions in the Arctic.

For these reasons, the country was often seen as being a potential target of the Soviets at the height of nuclear tensions in the 1960s. Extensive post-attack plans were drawn up for use in emergencies, and fallout shelters were built all across the country for use as command centres for governments of all levels, the Canadian Forces, and rescue personnel, such as fire services.

Different levels of command centres included:

- CEGF, Central Emergency Government Facility, located in Carp, Ontario, near the National Capital Region. Designed for use by senior federal politicians and civil servants.
- REGHQ, Regional Emergency Government Headquarters, of which there were seven, spread out across the country.
- MEGHQ, Municipal Emergency Government Headquarters
- ZEGHQ, Zone Emergency Government Headquarters, built within the basements of existing buildings, generally designed to hold around 70 staff.
- RU, Relocation Unit, or CRU, Central Relocation Unit. Often bunkers built as redundant backups to REGHQs and MEGHQs were given the RU designation.

==== United Kingdom ====
Constructed in 1938, the Cabinet War Rooms were used extensively by Sir Winston Churchill during the Second World War.

==== United States ====
A Command and Control Center is a specialized type of command center operated by a government or municipal agency 24 hours a day, 7 days a week. Various branches of the U.S. Military such as the U.S Coast Guard and the U.S. Navy have command and control centers.

They are also common in many large correctional facilities. A Command and Control Center operates as the agency's dispatch center, surveillance monitoring center, coordination office, and alarm monitoring center all in one.

Command and control centers are not staffed by high-level officials but rather by highly skilled technical staff. When a serious incident occurs the staff will notify the agency's higher level officials.

== In service businesses ==
A command center enables the real-time visibility and management of an entire service operation. Similar to an air traffic control center, a command center allows organizations to view the status of global service calls, service technicians, and service parts on a single screen. In addition, customer commitments or service level agreements (SLAs) that have been made can also be programmed into the command center and monitored to ensure all are met and customers are satisfied.

A command center is well suited for industries where coordinating field service (people, equipment, parts, and tools) is critical. Some examples:

- Intel's security Command Center
- Dell's Enterprise Command Center
- NASA's Mission Control Houston Command Center for Space Shuttle and ISS

War rooms can also be used for defining strategies, or driving business intelligence efforts.

== See also ==
- Air traffic control
- Air Defense Control Center
- Combat Information Center
- Control room
- C4ISTAR
- Dispatch
- Mission Control Center
- Network Operations Center
- Obeya
- White House Situation Room
