= Visual control =

Information communicated using visual signals in a business management setting

Visual control is a business management technique employed in many places where information is communicated by using visual signals instead of texts or other written instructions. The design is deliberate in allowing quick recognition of the information being communicated, in order to increase efficiency and clarity. These signals can be of many forms, from different coloured clothing for different teams, to focusing measures upon the size of the problem and not the size of the activity, to kanban, obeya and heijunka boxes and many other diverse examples. In The Toyota Way, it is also known as mieruka.

== Purpose ==
Visual control methods aim to increase the efficiency and effectiveness of a process by making the steps in that process more visible. The theory behind visual control is that if something is clearly visible or in plain sight, it is easy to remember and keep at the forefront of the mind. Another aspect of visual control is that everyone is given the same visual cues and so are likely to have the same vantage point.

There are many different techniques that are used to apply visual control in the workplace. Some companies use visual control as an organizational tool for materials. A clearly labeled storage board lets the employee know exactly where a tool belongs and what tools are missing from the display board. Another simple example of a common visual control is to have reminders posted on cubicle walls so that they remain in plain sight. Visual signs and signals communicate information that is needed to make effective decisions. These decisions may be safety oriented or they may give reminders as to what steps should be taken to resolve a problem. Most companies use visual controls in one degree or another, many of them not even realizing that the visual controls that they are making have a name and a function in the workplace. Whether it is recognized by the name of "visual control" or not, the fact is that replacing text or number with graphics makes a set of information easier to understand with only a glance, making it a more efficient way of communicating a message. It is also commonly used for internal team communication.

Visual controls are designed to make the control and management of a company as simple as possible. This entails making problems, abnormalities, or deviations from standards visible to everyone. When these deviations are visible and apparent to all, corrective action can be taken to immediately correct these problems.

Visual controls are meant to display the operating or progress status of a given operation in an easy to see format and also to provide instruction and to convey information. A visual control system must have an action component associated with it in the event that the visually represented procedures are not being followed in the real production process. Therefore, visual controls must also have a component where immediate feedback is provided to workers.

== Types ==
There are two groups and seven types of application in visual controls. Displays group and controls group.

- A visual display group relates information and data to employees in the area. For example, charts showing the monthly revenues of the company or a graphic depicting a certain type of quality issue that group members should be aware of. Large scale, (typically 2x4m) examples of this are known as communications boards. Communication boards are large enough to contain several displays and allow teams of people to view at once. This supports team decision making and promotes a "shared vision".
- A visual control group is intended to actually control or guide the action of the group members. Examples of controls are readily apparent in society: stop signs, handicap parking signs, no smoking signs, etc.
