= Big room =

Big room can refer to:

- Great room, a large room in a modern Western house
- Great hall, the largest room in a medieval manor
- Obeya, also known as "big room"; the equivalent of a "war room" in Japanese business
- Big room house, a subgenre of electro house dance music
- The Big Room, an album by the Norwegian duo M2M
- The Big Room, a cave chamber of the Tuckaleechee Caverns
