= Gemba =

Japanese term meaning "the actual place"

Genba (現場; also romanized as gemba) is a Japanese term used in business for the location where value is created, such as a factory floor, construction site, or sales floor.

In lean manufacturing, the most valuable ideas for improvement are thought to occur at the genba where problems are visible. Management teams may go on a gemba walk to look for opportunities to improve the practical shop floor (known as the genba kaizen). Unlike the similar strategy of management by walking around, gemba walks are typically not done randomly, but with a clear frequency, goal, and structure.

Glenn Mazur introduced this term into Quality Function Deployment (QFD, a quality system for new products before manufacturing has begun) to mean the customer's place of business or lifestyle. The idea is that to be customer-driven, one must go to the customer's gemba to understand their problems and opportunities, using all one's senses to gather and process data.

== Etymology ==
The word genba is a Japanese term meaning "the actual place" and is used in non-business contexts to refer to crime scenes or topical locations where TV may report. In a movie set, gemba refers to the practice of shooting a scene at the actual location rather than a studio.

== Gemba walk ==
Toyota executive Taiichi Ohno developed the gemba walk as a way for staff to stand back from day-to-day tasks and walk the floor of their workplace to identify wasteful activities. The objective of gemba walk is to understand the value stream and its problems rather than review results or make superficial comments. Along with Genchi Genbutsu or "Go, Look, See", gemba walk is one of the 5 Lean guiding principles that should be practiced by Lean leaders on a daily basis. The gemba walk, is an activity that takes management to the front lines to look for waste and opportunities to practice gemba kaizen, or practical shopfloor improvement.

== Variations ==
W. Edwards Deming suggested a similar idea of looking at the system from suppliers, through the entire organization, and to customers. Deming shared the idea during a 1950 visit to Japan. The commonly used models of production associated with lean, such as "value-stream mapping," do not extend to include suppliers, customers, or include a feedback loop to foster continual improvement of the system.

== See also ==
- Genchi Genbutsu
