= Command and control (management) =

Command-and-control management is categorised by systems thinkers as the dominant method of management in the Western world. Key influences are said to include Alfred P. Sloan, Henry Ford, James McKinsey of the eponymous accounting firm, and Frederick Winslow Taylor. A well-known modern exponent is Michael Barber, himself a partner in McKinsey & Company.

It is characterised by some systems thinkers according to the following attributes:

Perspective: Top-down and hierarchical
Design: Organisations divided into (ostensibly) independent functional silos. A practice propagated by Alfred Sloan and James McKinsey
Decision-making: Separated from work. A separation spearheaded by Frederick Winslow Taylor
Measures: Arbitrary targets analysed by binary comparison
Ethos: Control of staff
Change: Plans delivered by PRINCE2 methodology
Motivation: Control-by-seduction (carrot) and control-by-fear (stick)
Attitude to suppliers and customers: Contractual.

Key critics of the command-and-control management ethos and techniques include members of the systems-thinking community and associated thinkers, including W. Edwards Deming, John Seddon, Kōnosuke Matsushita, Taiichi Ohno, Russell L. Ackoff, Donella Meadows, Alfie Kohn, and the outspoken Vanguard Method practitioner John Little. In the 21st century John Seddon in particular has been deeply critical of successive UK governments' propagation of command-and-control thinking in the NHS, local authorities, and other public services.

Organisations credited with having moved away from the command-and-control paradigm to a systems-thinking philosophy include Harley Davidson and Aviva, in addition to many Japanese companies, such as Toyota, Honda, and Panasonic.

== See also ==
Out of the Crisis, W. Edwards Deming, 1986
Freedom from Command and Control, John Seddon, 2003
The Whitehall Effect, John Seddon, 2015
Punished by Rewards, Alfie Kohn, 1993
Thinking in Systems, Donella Meadows, 2008
Management f-Laws, Russell Ackoff, 2007
