= Union representative =

Official of a trade union

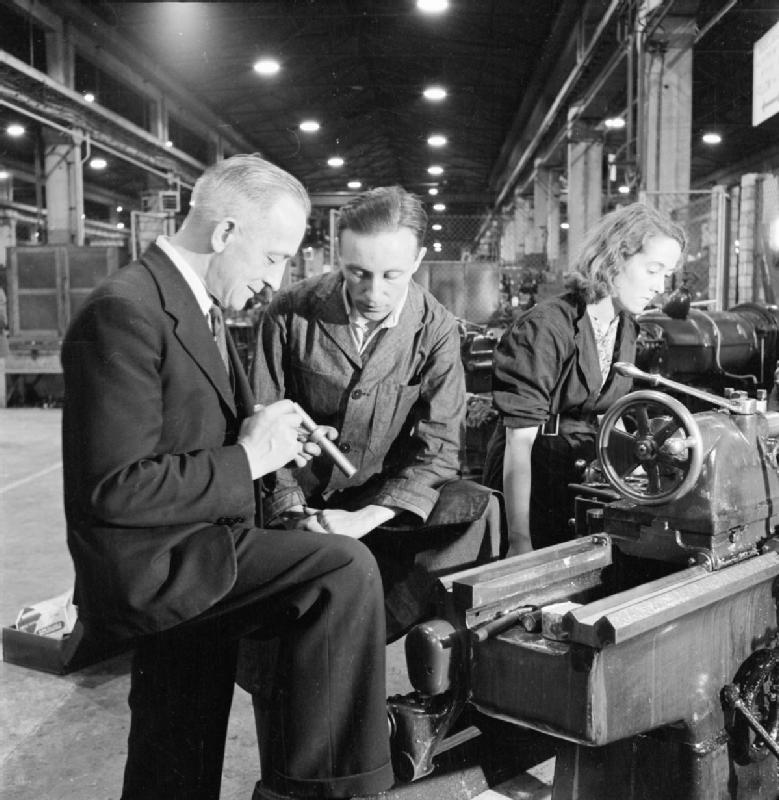
A British shop steward discusses an issue with a foreman during WWII

A union representative, union steward, or shop steward is an employee of an organization or company who represents and defends the interests of their fellow employees as a trades/labour union member and official. Rank-and-file members of the union hold this position voluntarily (through democratic election by fellow workers or sometimes by appointment of a higher union body) while maintaining their role as an employee of the firm. As a result, the union steward becomes a significant link and conduit of information between the union leadership and rank-and-file workers. Above the steward level, a bargaining unit chair is typically elected to coordinate union activities across the unit, lead formal negotiations, and represent the unit in dealings with management and the union's executive leadership.

== Duties ==
The duties of a union steward vary according to each trade union's constitutional mandate for the position. In general, most union stewards perform the following functions:

- Monitor and enforce the provisions of the collective bargaining agreement (labour contract) to ensure both the firm and union worker are not violating the terms of the agreement.
- Ensure that the firm is in compliance with all national, state and local laws and regulations.
- Represent and defend fellow workers whom the firm believes violated company policy or the terms and conditions of the collective bargaining agreement, often through the grievance process.
- Communicate and disseminate official union policy, memos and directives to workers in the shop.
- Popularize and promote union consciousness and values in the workplace.

Unlike other union representatives, stewards work on the shop floor, connecting workers with union officials at regional or national levels. The role of shop stewards may vary from being a mere representative of a larger national union towards independent structures with the power of collective bargaining in the workplace.

== In political history ==
In the United Kingdom, a network called Shop Stewards Movement organised shop stewards against the First World War. In Germany, a network of shop stewards called Revolutionary Stewards took an important role in the revolutionary "January Strike".

== Other designations ==
Father of the chapel (FoC) or mother of the chapel (MoC) are the titles in the United Kingdom and Australasia referring to a shop steward representing members of a trades union in a printing office or in journalism. The FoC or MoC is assisted by the clerk of the chapel or by a deputy FoC/MoC. In the printing trade, a chapel is the traditional name given to a meeting of compositors. The name originates in the early history of printing in Great Britain, though the National Union of Journalists states that the precise origins of the terms are unclear.
