= Management by wandering around =

Style of business management

The management by wandering around (MBWA), also management by walking around, refers to a style of business management which involves managers wandering around, in an unstructured manner, through their workplace(s) at random, to check with employees, equipment, or on the status of ongoing work. The emphasis is on the word wandering as an unplanned movement within a workplace, rather than a plan where employees expect a visit from managers at more systematic, pre-approved or scheduled times.

The expected benefit is that a manager who employs this method, by random sampling of events or employee discussions, is more likely to facilitate improvements to the morale, sense of organizational purpose, productivity and total quality management of the organization, as compared to remaining in a specific office area and waiting for employees, or the delivery of status reports, to arrive there, as events warrant in the workplace.

== History ==
The origin of the term has been traced to executives at Hewlett-Packard whose management practices involved walking around the facility. Their progressive business philosophy, called the HP Way, was based on management by objectives which involved giving employees a set of goals rather than telling them what to do. Managers walked around talking to employees to determine whether the goals were being met, and to ask the employees how management could help them attain the goals.

The general concept of managers making spontaneous visits to employees in the workplace has been a common practice in some other companies. The management consultants Tom Peters and Robert H. Waterman used the term in their 1982 book In Search of Excellence: Lessons from America's Best-Run Companies.

== Effects ==
Some studies and anecdotal reports claim that MBWA has a positive impact on productivity by improving employee morale. It can also provide managers with insight into the daily problems that employees face.

== See also ==
- Gemba walk – similar, but more formalized method developed at Toyota
- Total quality management
- W. Edwards Deming
