= Frequent deliveries =

Frequent deliveries are a largely ignored but powerful way of leveling apparent demand within a supply chain and thereby reducing Mura. What is perhaps not so obvious is that this will reduce inventory levels and thereby assist progress along the Lean journey at the same time. The historical focus upon carrying full loads, sometimes of only one product, reduces the unit cost of transport but has sometimes hidden the true costs associated with achieving those transport discounts. It is also possible to gain some of these benefits by 'faking' frequent deliveries at the supply site.

== Principles ==
=== Reducing production lot size and raising delivery frequency ===
If we model this idea using a factory that produces three products (Triangles, Circles and Squares) and is making a regular daily delivery to its customer at the end of each day then we can represent this as below.

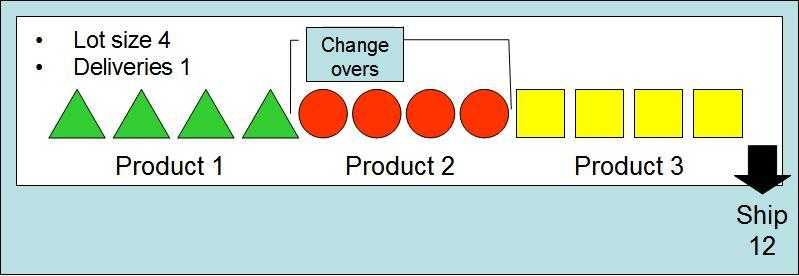
Original Situation

Stock builds up during the day until the factory has completed the production campaign of three products each of which is produced in a lot of four. After each lot of four a line-changeover happens, there are in fact three as we must include the one before the first production lot. Stock builds here to a maximum of twelve units. If the number of changeovers were doubled to six, then the stock levels would remain the same; all the stock is still on site until the shipment.

The customer is receiving a mix of products that it is likely that they consume (or their in-stock equivalent) during, say, the next day. If the customer consumes the provided products during the day, then their stock level will decrease by twelve over the day.

So if the customer will agree to receive half the daily shipment of each product halfway through the day and the second half at the original time of end-of-day and we reduce lot sizes by a factor of two the factory schedule would look like this.

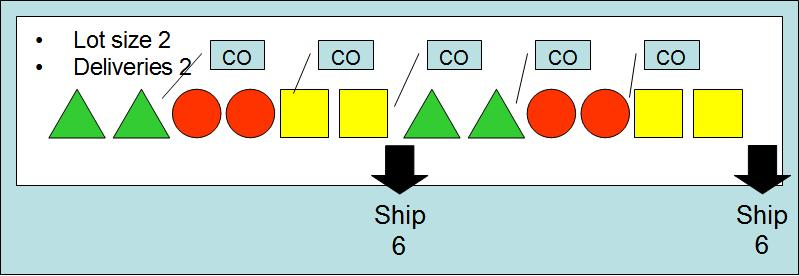
Double the deliveries and halve the lot size

We now see that the benefits of the lot size reduction in the stock levels, both at the customer and the supplying factory. Stock at both locations has been reduced by six. A possible downside for the factory is that it now has twice the changeovers (See Single-Minute Exchange of Die (SMED)).

If we take this to the extreme where the factory now has a changeover after every unit of production (single piece flow) and where shipments occur after every campaign (every product has been made) then the factory has this situation.

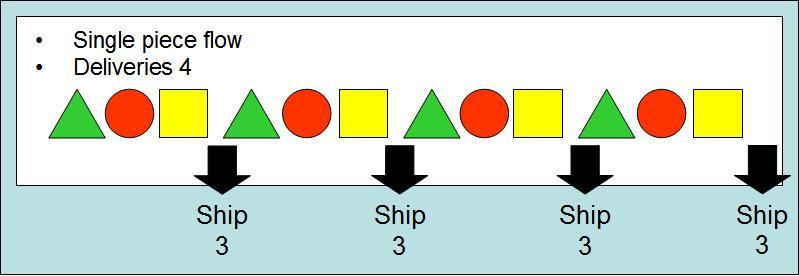
Single piece flow and ship every campaign

Now stock levels, again at the customer and supplier, are down to three from twelve. To achieve this cost effectively the changeovers must be very quick.

=== Just raising delivery frequency ===
So starting from the same original situation.

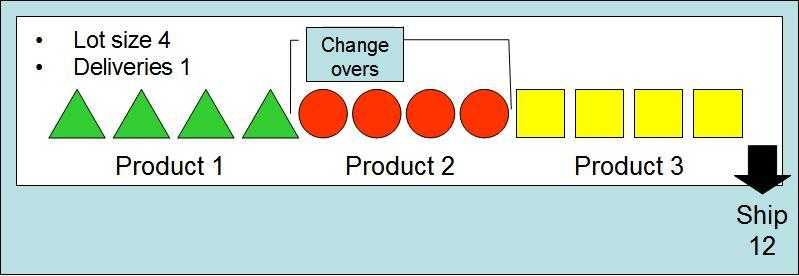
Original Situation

The factory chooses to just make the deliveries more frequent but not change production lot size, and to keep some extra stock so that deliveries can be exactly as in the model where lot sizes were changed as well.

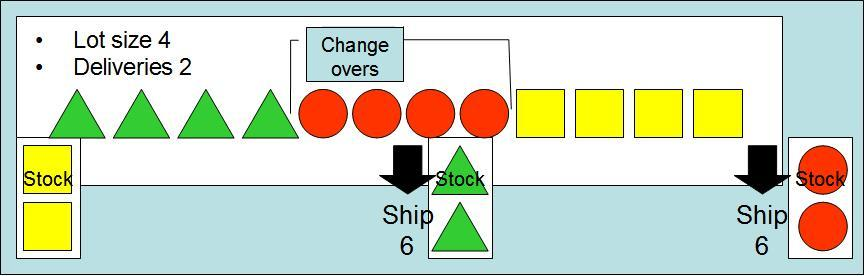
Stock holding and more frequent deliveries

Here, although an extra stock of two is constantly being held it can be seen that the deliveries still reduce the holding by six giving a net benefit of four at the factory and six at the customer. This is without changing the production schedule.

If, again, this is taken to the extreme where deliveries are going to be made of one unit of each product and stock keeping adjusted to make this possible then this situation is seen.

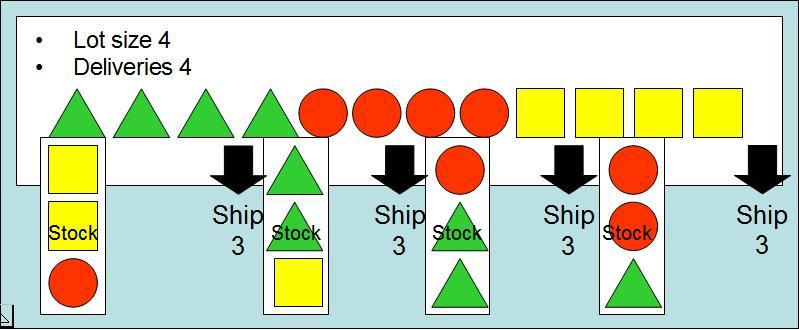
Stock holding and most frequent deliveries

Here, although an extra stock of three is constantly being held it can be seen that the deliveries still reduce the holding by nine giving a net benefit of six at the factory and nine at the customer. This is still without changing the production schedule.

=== Summary ===
So from this example it can be seen that just increasing delivery frequency reduces the stock held in the system. This is no surprise to those in the context of station to station within a factory. It does seem to surprise many when used in the context of supplier to customer. The summary of this argument is in the table below.

Stock levels with different lot sizes and delivery frequencies
	One delivery	Two deliveries	Four deliveries
Lot size 4	12	8	6
Lot size 2	12	6	4
Lot size 1	12	6	3

== Implementation ==
Many of the benefits within the factory can be achieved by 'faking' frequent deliveries while discussions with the customer about actual delivery frequencies takes place.

=== Faking frequent deliveries ===
The removal of items in the factory from the 'manufacturing system' will trigger the resupply that we wish to smooth via kanban or other signals. The frequent deliveries will provide a smoother sequence of smaller resupply signals. So by 'faking it' what is meant is that the actual delivery schedule will be de-coupled from the resupply triggers in the factory.

This can be done by marking a position on the floor, say a rectangular outline of perhaps the same size as the truck, in the loading bay and designating it to be a specific planned delivery or part of one. Let's call that outline a 'virtual truck'. Clearly if all the items for the delivery were now loaded into the virtual truck then the impact on demand signals into the factory would be the same as a real truck load. The secret here is to schedule a steady flow of items from the factory into the virtual truck so that demand appears as flat as possible. Obviously this may seem like 'smoke and mirrors' since the goods are still actually in the loading bay. The importance is that demand and supply are now decoupled. So whilst a real truck can still be loaded at the required speed, from the virtual truck, the signals for resupply passing via kanbans etc. back into the factory have created a smooth demand. This method can also be used to give early warning to the factory that it is falling behind the required schedule if it is to have all goods ready for shipment when the real truck arrives.

The downside of this trick is that there are now two movements of the goods, one to the virtual truck and one from it to the real truck.

=== Actual frequent deliveries ===
Since these need to meet agreement with the customer these will be less flexible than the 'virtual truck's' unless they are part of an internal process. Between 1982 and 1990 Toyota reorganised its service and crash parts business and as part of that it established Local Distribution Centres (LDCs) in each metropolitan centre. It also encouraged dealers to work intensively with customers so that maintenance was scheduled sufficiently in advance that parts requirements could be precisely predicted.

Because the LDCs are so close to the dealers it was possible to establish a 'milk run' which visited every dealer every two hours. So when the service is booked a preliminary order is prepared for the required parts. The day before the scheduled service the customer is called to confirm the service and then a firm order to the LDC is placed for delivery on the next 'milk run'. Finally, when the car arrives for its service it is inspected and any other required parts ordered for delivery with 2–4 hours (the next run). This has resulted in very significant stock reductions throughout the system as the table below illustrates.

	USA 1994	USA 1996	Japan 1990
Parts Distribution Centre	50,000 120	65,000 30	60,000 18
Local Distribution Centre	-	-	15,000 9
Dealer	4,000 90	6,000 21	40 3
Stock Level Index	100	33	19
Service Rate	98% in 7 days	98% in 1 day	98% in 2 hours
