= Nemawashi =

In Japan, initial informal discussions

Nemawashi (根回し) is an informal Japanese business process of laying the foundation for some proposed change or project by talking to the people concerned and gathering support and feedback before a formal announcement. It is considered an important element in any major change in the Japanese business environment before any formal steps are taken. Successful nemawashi enables changes to be carried out with the consent of all sides, avoiding embarrassment.

Nemawashi literally translates as "turning the roots", from ne (根, "root") and mawasu (回す, "to turn something, to put something around something else"). Its original meaning was literal: in preparation for transplanting a tree, one would carefully dig around a tree some time before transplanting, and trim the roots to encourage the growth of smaller roots that will help the tree become established in its new location.

Nemawashi is often cited as an example of a Japanese word which is difficult to translate effectively, because it is tied so closely to Japanese culture itself, although it is often translated as "laying the groundwork."

In Japan, high-ranking people expect to be let in on new proposals prior to an official meeting. If they find out about something for the first time during the meeting, they will feel that they have been ignored, and they may reject it for that reason alone. Thus, it's important to approach these people individually before the meeting. This provides an opportunity to introduce the proposal to them and gauge their reaction. This is also a good chance to hear their input.

The term is associated with forming a consensus, along with ringiseido (which is a more formal process). There is debate whether Nemawashi is truly co-operative, or if sometimes those consulted have little choice but to agree. The process can be time consuming.

== See also ==
- Japanese management culture
- Lobbying
- Polder model - Dutch form of consensus building
- Toyota Production System
