= Shop floor =

Indoor production area

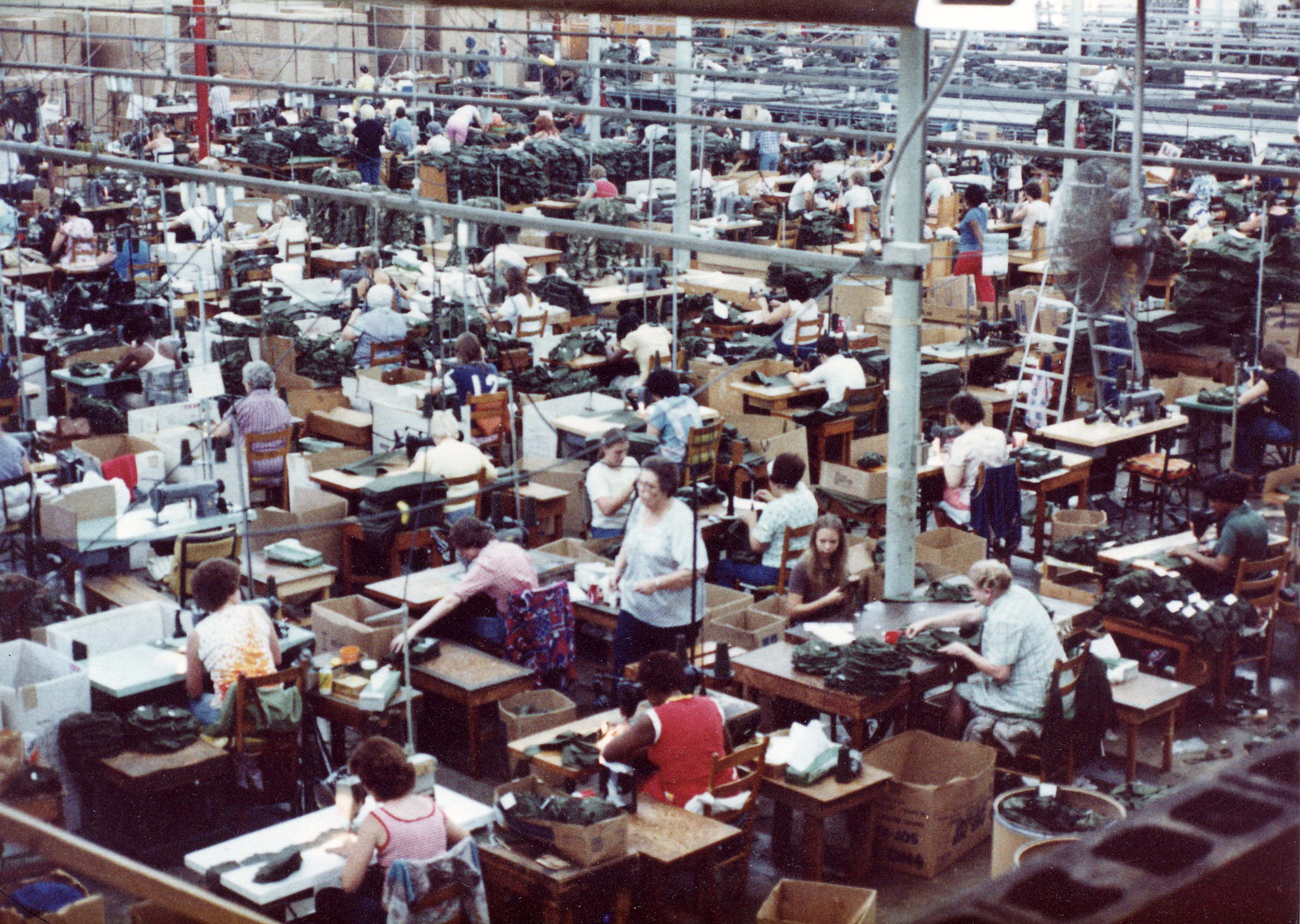

The shop floor is the production area, such as in a factory or another working space and is the floor where workers produce goods. The term "shop floor" refers to the area of a factory where production takes place. The shop floor excludes the area used or designated for administrative activities, as well as the tool room.

== Shop stewards and Shop Stewards Movement ==
A shop steward is an employee of a company or organization who, as a labor union member and official, represents and defends the interests of their coworkers. During the First World War, the Shop Stewards Movement brought together shop stewards from across the United Kingdom. It began with the Clyde Workers Committee, Britain's first shop stewards committee, which organized in response to the imprisonment of three of their members in 1915.

== Shop floor control ==
Systems for managing the various components of the manufacturing process are known as shop floor control (SFC) systems.

Shop floor control is one of the functions of manufacturing control; it is the process of monitoring the production activities as they happen, such as when the product is being processed, assembled, inspected, etc. It is also concerned with the shop floor inventories—short and excessive inventories that may cause losses.

=== Integrated shop floor management ===
The manufacturing industry is significantly impacted by technological advances such as the Internet, the Web, and intelligent agents. Changing shop floor environments and customer needs are sufficed with new kinds of shop floor control systems that are web-based shop floor control systems, also called e-shop floor or i-shop floor.

== See also ==
- Inventory control
- Operations management
