= Hansei =

Japanese cultural concept

Hansei (反省; "self-reflection") is a central idea in Japanese culture, meaning to acknowledge one's own mistake and to pledge improvement. This is similar to the proverb "self insight is the first step to bettering" (German: Selbsterkenntnis ist der erste Schritt zur Besserung).

== Meaning ==
In the hansei process, the emphasis is on what went wrong and on creating clear plans for ensuring that it does not reoccur; this is done constantly and consistently.

== Other use ==
Hansei also incorporates the concept of greeting success with modesty and humility. To stop hansei means to stop learning.

With hansei, one never becomes convinced of one's own superiority, and feels that there is always more room, or need, for further improvement.

== Examples ==
An example would be the actions of Japanese politicians involved in corruption.

They apologize publicly for the inappropriate action, then remove themselves from public politics for a few years. They resume their career after a culturally accepted period of time where they learned their lesson.

In Japanese companies it is common practice for a manager to expect hansei from his subordinates in case of mistakes. The manager will publicly take the blame, while the department works on solving the problem.

At Toyota, even if one completes a project successfully, there is still a hansei-kai (reflection meeting) to review what went wrong.

If a manager or engineer claims that there were not any problems with the project, they will be reminded that “no problem is a problem”, meaning that one has not objectively and critically evaluated the project to find opportunities for improvement.

No problems indicate that one did not stretch to meet (or exceed) their expected capacity.

== See also ==
- Self-criticism
