= Just in sequence =

Inventory strategy

Just in sequence (JIS) is an inventory strategy that matches just in time (JIT) and complete fit in sequence with variation of assembly line production. Components and parts arrive at a production line right in time as scheduled before they get assembled. Feedback from the manufacturing line is used to coordinate transport to and from the process area. When implemented successfully, JIS improves a company's return on assets (ROA), without loss in flexibility, quality or overall efficiency. JIS is mainly implemented with car manufacture.

JIS is sometimes called In-Line Vehicle Sequencing (ILVS).

== Just in sequence is just in time ==
Just in sequence (JIS) is just one specialised strategy to achieve just in time (JIT). The process concept of JIT sees buffers at the production line as waste in capital bound. The aim is to eliminate buffers as much as possible at the expense of stability when disturbances arise. Just In Sequence is one of the most extreme applications of the concept, where components arrive Just In Time and sequenced for consumption.

The sequencing allows companies to eliminate supply buffers as soon as the quantity in component part buffers necessary is reduced to a minimum. If not sequencing according to scheduled variety of production, all required components must be stocked in buffers. For flexible production lines, such as a modern automotive assembly line, the variety is an option to produce directly on customer orders. As soon as the next order arrives at the work center, the scheduler distributes the supply orders inline with the production sequence of the final production line.

=== Displacement of buffers upwards to suppliers ===
However, with JIS the buffer quantities are displaced upward in material flow to the components suppliers. It is a misinterpretation of JIS to assume that all buffers will be eliminated. Hence just the cost for buffer inventory becomes re-allocated to the producers of the supplies. Sequencing eliminates buffers in the final assembly line by consolidating all similar components into distributed and sequenced buffers, which partly reside on the paths of transport to final assembly. This strategy thus reduces the line-side inventory buffer. However, the effect is worse when the sequence does not get correctly scheduled upwards or when the transport line gets congested.

=== Introduction of JIS concepts ===
Just In Sequence processes are typically implemented only after the company has achieved a high degree of competency on Just In Time processes. The first step for the organization is to implement JIT processes to synchronize all manufacturing and material departments inside the plant and to collaborate with suppliers, customers, and sub-contractors to reduce inventory buffers to within a few hours. This process typically uncovers deep manufacturing and logistic issues that are not easy to overcome (see JIT Implementation for more details). The manufacturing company can only benefit from sequencing items once these problems have been resolved successfully and components are delivered Just In Time.

Sequencing can be implemented in a Just In Time supply operation at many levels, bringing ever-higher inventory reduction and financial benefits:

Just In Sequence Process	Description	Impact
Pick-to-sequence	Items are picked from an on-site buffer, sequenced, and delivered to production	Reduces buffers in production area, improving work in process and cycle time
Ship-to-sequence then Receive-to-sequence	Items are sequenced at the supplier (internal or external), delivered in sequence, and taken directly to the production line	Reduces the amount of component and semi-finished goods inventory overall in the plant, freeing up cash, and reducing carrying costs
Make- Assemble- Build-to-sequence	Items are built according to the sequence in which they will be required by the customer or downstream departments	Reduces the amount of finished goods or semi-finished goods in inventory, freeing up additional cash, and reducing carrying costs

== Implementing JIS concepts ==
Just In Sequence implementations introduce a number of new process requirements on top of Just In Time practices. A production sequence or final assembly sequence must be shared upwards to suppliers and sub-contractors. Feedback to customers must be organized according to the scheduled output to earn all positive financial effects. For these and other reasons, the actual production sequence must be "broadcast" out to all relevant parties once it is firm. This "broadcast" can be done over the phone, paper, email, or other automated IT system. UN/EDIFACT supports an EDI message standard called DELJIT as one standardized way to communicate this information.

Once the sequence is broadcast, each party must immediately take action to deliver sequenced parts in time. In many cases the turn-around time from broadcast to final assembly is less than 2 hours, with some components required in 30 minutes or less. With this time frame, there is little room for errors. In addition, quality inspection and poka-yoke must be implemented in the sequencing step to guarantee that the sequenced components match the assembly sequence perfectly. In many cases, suppliers must manage periodic sequence reversals, for example, when loading racks into a truck, since the first rack into the truck is the last one to come out. Employees and systems must also properly manage exceptional scenarios, such as re-processing damaged items after initial sequencing, skipping slots for scrapped items, etc. Just In Sequence implementations can only be successful if all of these processes are implemented correctly and all people involved understand what is at stake.

=== Limitations ===
In many manufacturing operations, the actual production sequence cannot be planned ahead of time with enough certainty to enable sequencing. The main reason is that some manufacturing processes require re-work frequently so that a scheduled sequence becomes irrelevant. For example, painting operations in an automotive plant can have re-work levels of up to 20% (USA, Southern Europe).
