= Muri (Japanese term) =

Japanese business term

Muri (無理) is a Japanese word meaning "unreasonableness; impossible; beyond one's power; too difficult; by force; perforce; forcibly; compulsorily; excessiveness; immoderation". In lean manufacturing and the Toyota Production System (TPS), muri is commonly translated as "overburden" or "unreasonable requirements" and is discussed together with muda and mura as one of the three related forms of waste or inefficiency to be reduced.

== In lean manufacturing ==
In the Toyota Production System, muri refers to placing excessive or unreasonable demands on people, equipment or processes. Toyota describes TPS as being based on making work easier for workers while eliminating waste, inconsistencies and unreasonable requirements, known in Japanese as muda, mura and muri respectively. In this context, reducing muri means designing work so that it can be performed safely, consistently and within realistic limits.

The Lean Enterprise Institute defines muri as overburdening equipment or operators by requiring them to work at a higher or harder pace, with more force or effort, or for a longer period than equipment design and appropriate workforce management allow. Examples can include expecting a machine to operate beyond its rated capacity, requiring workers to maintain an unsustainable pace, or setting a production target that cannot be achieved without excessive strain.

== Relationship with muda and mura ==
Muri is usually considered together with muda and mura. Muda refers to wasteful activity, while mura refers to unevenness or irregularity in work or production. These three concepts are connected because uneven production or poor planning can create overburden, and overburden can in turn lead to defects, delays, breakdowns or other forms of waste.

In lean practice, reducing muri may involve leveling workloads, improving process design, matching production pace to demand, and ensuring that people and machines are not used beyond sustainable limits. Toyota links this approach with kaizen, or continuous improvement, by first making work smooth and correct before improving or automating it.
