= Obeya =

Concept in lean manufacturing

Obeya (from Japanese Ōbeya 大部屋 "large room") is a team spirit improvement tool at an administrative level, originating from a long history of learning & improving. It is considered a component of lean manufacturing. Obeya objectives are rapid decision-making, reduction in rework and reconsiderations, and reduction in unnecessary discussions. The Obeya Association enumerates 11 Obeya Principles that define Obeya and guide its improvement.

The earliest notion of concept is believed to be the Analects of Confucius nearly 2500 years ago (China, 206 BC–220 AD). The use of Obeya rooms has been proven by many companies to be successful.

== Description ==
The Obeya can be understood as a team spirit improvement tool at an administrative level. It originated from a long history of learning & improving. Often associated in product development, an Obeya room can also be a place for software development, a command center, managing new business strategy, workflow and project management. This tool forces people to work together without distractions and creates a great atmosphere to generate new ideas. Conceptually akin to a traditional "war room", an Obeya will contain visually engaging charts and graphs depicting such information as program timing, milestones and progress-to-date and countermeasures to existing technical or scheduling issues.

It is considered a component of lean manufacturing and in particular the Toyota Production System. A variety of different analogies have been drawn between an Obeya and other real life systems and structures. One such example is the bridge of a ship, where many different crewmates come together to support the operation of a complex entity by allowing all roles to be connected and understood. Obeya has been described as "the brain of the system".

During the product and process development, all individuals involved in managerial planning meet in a "great room" to speed up communication and decision-making. This is intended to increase efficiency and bring a better flow to the project, as well as an understanding of one's role within the cycle of the process.

=== Objectives ===
The objectives behind an Obeya are rapid decision-making, reduction in rework and reconsiderations, and reduction in unnecessary discussions.

Moreover, it is a method where multiple information sources are combined for optimal decision making, involving multiple parties simultaneously. This makes it an excellent governing model for organizations that work Agile, Lean, or plan to do so.

The Obeya model is an inclusive organizational model as opposed to the hierarchical organizational models. So, an Obeya makes it possible to "design" for collaboration. In an Obeya strategy meets execution and (quite literally) the people involved in these subjects respectfully engage in conversation with each other.

Obeya's objectives involve helping to answer the following questions:

- Are we connected?
- Is everyone working on the same things?
- Are we meeting delivery/deadlines?
- Do our decisions reach everyone?
- Are we looking at the right information?
- What problems do we want to solve?
- Are the right people involved?

== The 11 Obeya Principles ==
Set up by the Obeya Association, the 11 Obeya Principles define Obeya and guide its improvement – regardless of what methodology or approach you choose for your Obeya setup. Developed, used, tried and tested by the founders of the Obeya Association; Dolf Reijnders and Bart Bongers, as well as other Obeya practitioners worldwide; the 11 Obeya Principles serve as guiding star for all that is Obeya related.

=== About the Obeya Principles ===
There are common traits and characteristics that are shared by most Obeya that are represented in the 11 Obeya Principles. The Obeya Principles collect and synthesise these characteristics and aid best practice sharing. They are meant to guide Obeya use and development. The Obeya Principles provide a common language and a conceptual foundation of Obeya.

An Obeya means to work across 4 quadrants: Mindset, Alignment, Workspace and Content. The 11 Principles further define how to approach work in an Obeya in every quadrant. The relative order of the separate Principles are regardless of their relevance.

The combination of the principles with the roles Obeya Builders and Obeya Hosts provide a solid framework to approach Obeya. It provides grip in your Obeya setup without loss of flexibility.

Mindset

1. People come together in the Obeya to respectfully see, learn & act on vital information
2. People are committed to engage in continuous improvement, resolving obstacles along the way

Alignment

3. In the Obeya, we communicate a strong sense of purpose
4. Purpose is recognizably tied to our organizational strategy through meaningful objectives
5. The Obeya connects strategy to execution with visible orientation on customer experience
6. The Obeya meetings have a rhythm in sync with the operational heartbeat of the organization

Workspace

7. The Obeya visuals provide a logical and practical information and conversation flow
8. The Obeya reflects a good understanding of the flow of work from start to delivery
9. The Obeya is an attractive and available area, in proximity to the workfloor

Content

10. In the Obeya, we use analytics-driven-evidence to make business decisions.
11. Data owners ensure information is easy to consume, readily available, up to date, and visually attractive

== History ==
The Analects of Confucius 2500 years ago (China, 206 BC–220 AD) seems to be the earliest notion of what later developed into many different management philosophies. It is believed to have been written up by Confucius disciples over the course of 30 to 50 years. The Analects could be regarded as influential social and ethical philosophy. Rich, diverse and over 2500 years old, Confucian tradition teaches about the idea that good life lies in social relations, starting with family and extending into friends and community. Confucianism highlights the question of what roles we occupy in our lifetime and what our obligations are regarding those roles. Confucius proposed learning as a cycle of stages. in which early stages are focused around improving understanding. Next. We need to think critically about what we (want to) learn, according to Confucius, simultaneously. We see the development of actual physical places where' the way is practiced 'evolving throughout Eastern history, making use of visual stimulation. It's not hard to draw links to modern day Obeya use. Confucianism favors light government, informal means of social control and emotional harmony. Confucius can be considered an educator. encouraging constant questioning in the pursuit of learning.

Later in history on the other side of the world, the West started building upon an idea what we would now call a scientific approach. Francis Bacon (1561-1626 AD), an English philosopher and statesman, can be regarded as highly influential. He argued for inductive reasoning and careful observation (often derived from nature) to avoid misleading. One of Bacons' goals in life was to uncover truth. His methodological ways to uncover truth (science) also show a clear link to modern day Obeya's. It is believed that Bacons 'approach provided the roots of Plan-Do-Check-Act (PDCA) improvement cycles as proposed by Shewhart and Deming and eventually laid the foundations for SCRUM and Agile. With the start of the Industrial Age roughly from the 1800s on, management practices evolve, and Eastern and Western management philosophies start to influence each other. In Japan, Toyota successfully adopted Deming's ideas, which lead to the Toyota Production system (TPS). Resulting in higher standards for manufacturing. The resulting competition motivated American manufacturers to implement statistical quality control in the United States. From the 1980s, both MIT and Harvard play vital roles in modeling management practices and providing empirical data / analyses. Visual management and the use of Obeya rooms became an integral part of said practices and are still becoming increasingly popular in modern days. Researching Obeya's rich historical background shows:

- Many exchanges between Eastern and Western philosophies throughout history
- Strong link with improvement cycles, especially PDCA
- Obeya practice logically rooted within both Lean and Agile practices Both MIT and Harvard have been influential, modeling practices and making them
- Focus on work floor and human development

== Company usage ==
The use of Obeya rooms has been proven by many companies to be successful. Some examples of large businesses that use such a room are Toyota, Nike, Boeing, and Volvo. These rooms help to promote problem solving among teams, as well as building communication and encourage team building. Silos are sections of companies that only communicate within their specific divisions or departments. Obeya rooms are designed to reduce silos within companies and increase communication.

An obeya room gives leaders a clear view of what everyone is working on, as well as why and how. They also can see how their own department's efforts support or hinder their colleagues.

=== Toyota ===
The roots of what is now a valuable management practice can be found across continents with many disciplines influencing each other throughout history. One of the more recognizable modern examples involving Obeya was at Toyota during the G21 (Globe 21st century) Project, while building the Prius. Takeshi Uchiyamada, Chief Engineer of the G21 project, "felt that he lacked the necessary authority to make the optimal decisions and thought he could be overrun by experienced discipline leaders in a way that was not optimal for the project as such". This need for support from the other leaders that Uchiyamada identified, is what manifested for him the first use of Obeya "large room" in this environment. The Obeya, was instituted "as an arena for all his discussions with the discipline leaders. In this room, the other discipline leaders would be present, and documents and data would be available to all."

=== Nike Europe ===
The Obeya Room has been proven to be the ticket to success and team building for leading shoe manufacturer Nike Europe. They began to incorporate the use of Obeya room for their IT department. When they began to use the Obeya room they, "decided to focus on the Portfolio and Project Management function within Technology, for which we already had a lot of information." As use of Obeya rooms in this instance proved to be successful, the more Nike used the Obeya Room in other departments as well. Nike also realized that the more they focused on the success of the Obeya room, the effect was nothing short of positive. Mathijssen also states, "In our experience, an Obeya room creates a safety zone to make goals and problems visible, so they can be discussed openly, which leads to creative problem solving and innovation." All of which are the primary goals for the Obeya room no matter what business it is part of; a comfortable space for innovation, open communication, and problem solving.

== Extended concepts ==
=== Adrenaline room ===
Toyota Industrial Equipment Manufacturing Inc. (TIEM) implemented the obeya room and saw it as a "valuable contributor to their lean enterprises". It is referred as the adrenaline room, where managers go beyond reporting data and keeping teams up to date, but make a commitment to move forward with daily goals. Through active collaboration and support of all associates, real-time ideas get to build and real-time issues get solved.

=== iObeya ===
Many manufacturing companies have implemented the obeya room across factory operations. However, the Obeya room could not be implemented across all functions, which led to iObeya. iObeya is a digital visual management platform that mimics the Obeya room experience virtually. It lets many firms collaborate effectively in a virtual setting. Jusko has reported that both Volvo and PSA Group are using iObeya to support their global collaboration efforts.

== See also ==
- Toyota Production System § Commonly used terminology
