= Mura (Japanese term) =

Japanese meaning unevenness; irregularity; lack of uniformity; nonuniformity; inequality

Mura (斑) is a Japanese word meaning "unevenness; irregularity; lack of uniformity; nonuniformity; inequality", and is a key concept in the Toyota Production System (TPS) as one of the three types of waste (muda, mura, muri). Waste in this context refers to the wasting of time or resources rather than wasteful by-products and should not be confused with waste reduction. Toyota adopted these three Japanese words as part of their product improvement program, due to their familiarity in common usage.

== Examples ==
Mura is avoided through just-in-time manufacturing systems, which are based on keeping little or no inventory. These systems supply the production process with the right part, at the right time, in the right amount, using first-in, first-out (FIFO) component flow. Just-in-time systems create a "pull system" in which each sub-process withdraws its needs from the preceding sub-processes and ultimately from an outside supplier. When a preceding process does not receive a request or withdrawal, it does not make more parts. This type of system is designed to maximize productivity by minimizing storage overhead.

For example:

1. The assembly line "makes a request to", or "pulls from" the Paint Shop, which pulls from Body Weld.
2. The Body Weld shop pulls from Stamping.
3. At the same time, requests are going out to suppliers for specific parts, for the vehicles that have been ordered by customers.
4. Small buffers accommodate minor fluctuations, yet allow continuous flow.

If parts or material defects are found in one process, the just-in-time approach requires that the problem be quickly identified and corrected.

== Implementation ==
Production leveling, also called heijunka, and frequent deliveries to customer are key to identifying and eliminating mura. The use of different types of kanban to control inventory at different stages in the process are key to ensuring that "pull" is happening between sub-processes. Leveling production, even when different products are produced in the same system, will aid in scheduling work in a standard way that encourages lower costs.

It is also possible to smooth the workflow by having one operator work across several machines in a process rather than having different operators--in a sense merging several sub-processes under one operator. The fact that there is one operator helps ensure smoothness across the operations because the workpiece flows with the operator. There is no reason why the several operators cannot all work across these several machines following each other and carrying their workpiece with them. This multiple machine handling is called "multi-process handling" in the Toyota Production System.

Another means of detecting and reducing mura is increasing the process' standardization—ensuring that all workers understand and can handle each type of request that they come across along a clear, step-by-step protocol. Working to simplify the process as much as possible can also help to drive down the unevenness-generating complexities. One can also aid variability detection by performance monitoring through histograms and statistical control charts.

== Limitations, critiques and improvements ==
Some processes have considerable lead time and unusually high costs for production downtime. When this is the case, it is often desirable to try to predict the upcoming demand from a sub-process before pull occurs or a card is generated. The smoother the process, the more accurately this can be done from analysis of previous historical experience.

Some processes have asymmetric cost. In such situations, it may be better to err away from the higher cost error. In this case, there appears to be waste and higher average error, but the waste or errors are smaller ones and in aggregate leads to lower costs and more customer value.

For example, consider running a call center. It may be more effective to have low cost call center operators wait for high value clients rather than risk losing high value clients by making them wait. Given the asymmetric cost of these errors—particularly if the processes are not smooth—it may be prudent to have what seems like a surplus of call center operators that appear to be "wasting" call center operator time, rather than commit the higher-cost error of losing the occasional high value client.
