= Muda (Japanese term) =

Japanese concept in lean process thinking

Muda (無駄; on'yomi reading, ateji) is a Japanese word meaning "futility", "uselessness", or "wastefulness", and is a key concept in lean process thinking such as in the Toyota Production System (TPS), denoting one of three types of deviation from optimal allocation of resources. The other types are known by the Japanese terms mura ("unevenness") and muri ("overload"). Waste in this context refers to the wasting of time or resources rather than wasteful by-products and should not be confused with waste reduction.

When determining whether the concept of muda applies, the concept of "value-added work" is considered. Value-added work is any activity that produces goods or provides a service for which an end-customer is willing to pay; muda is any constraint or impediment that causes waste to occur.

There are two types of muda:

- Muda type I: non value-adding, but necessary for end-customers. These are usually harder to eliminate because while classified as non-value adding, they are necessary.
- Muda type II: non value-adding and unnecessary for end-customers. These contribute to waste, incur hidden costs and should be eliminated.

== Toyota's seven forms of waste ==
Taiichi Ohno, the "father" of the Toyota Production System, originally identified seven forms of muda or waste:

Transporting
Every time a product is touched or moved unnecessarily, there is a risk that it could be damaged, lost, delayed, etc. as well as being a cost for no added value. Transporting does not add value to the product, i.e. is not a transformation for which the consumer is willing to pay.
Inventory
Whether in the form of raw materials, work-in-progress (WIP), or finished goods, inventory represents a capital outlay that cannot yet produce an income. The longer a product sits in one of these states, the more it contributes to waste.
Motion
In contrast to transportation, which refers to damage and transaction costs associated with moving the product, motion refers to the damage and costs inflicted on what creates the product. This can include wear and tear for equipment, repetitive strain injuries for workers or unnecessary downtime.
Waiting
Whenever the product is not in transportation or being processed, it is waiting (typically in a queue). In traditional processes, a large part of an individual product's life is spent waiting to be worked on.
Over-production
Making more of a product than is required results in several forms of waste, typically caused by production in large batches. The customer's needs often change over the time it takes to produce a larger batch. Over-production has been described as the worst kind of waste.
Over-processing
Doing more to a product than is required by the end-customer results in it taking longer and costing more to produce. This also includes using components that are more precise, complex, expensive or higher quality than absolutely required.
Defects
Having to discard or rework a product due to earlier defective work or components results in additional cost and delays.

=== Unused skills ===
Organizations often under-utilize the skills of their workers, or permit workers to operate in silos so that knowledge is not shared. This was added to the original seven forms of waste, as resolving this waste is a key enabler to resolving the others.

A mnemonic may be useful for remembering the categories of waste, such as TIM WOOD or TIM WOODS (with the S referring to Skills).

== Alternative forms of waste ==
The eight forms of waste were developed specifically for Toyota's processes. Other companies and individuals have elucidated or identified other forms of waste. Some examples follow:

=== Canon's nine wastes ===
- Work-in-process waste: e.g. stocking items not immediately needed
- Defect waste: producing defective products
- Equipment waste: idle or broken machinery; empty facilities; taking too long for setup
- Investment or expense waste: overuse of resources for required output
- Indirect labor waste: excess personnel due to unskillful use of indirect labor
- Human resources or talent waste: employing people whose talents exceed job requirements, when the job can be mechanized or assigned to less skilled people
- Operations or motion waste: not working according to the best standards
- Planning or product design waste: implementing processes or producing products with more functionality than necessary
- Start-up waste: waste or inefficiency in the ramp-up or stabilization of the production of a new product

=== Confusion ===
General uncertainty about the right thing to do, or absence of documented procedures and operating statements.

=== Self-doubt ===
Writer Jim Womack described "thinking you can't" as the worst form of waste, quoting Henry Ford's aphorism:

Henry Ford probably said it best when he noted, "You can think you can achieve something or you can think you can't and you will be right."

== Implementation ==
Shigeo Shingo divides process related activity into Processing and Operations. Processing refers to the course of material that is transformed into final product, Operations refers to the actions performed on the material by workers and machines, including activities such as transportation, inspection and delay. Value is added by the Processing activities, whereas Operations activities are considered waste and should be reduced to a minimum. Shingo states that whereas many see Processing and Operations in parallel he sees them at right angles (orthogonal) (see Value Stream Mapping).

Many TPS/Lean techniques work in a similar fashion. Waste is determined by identifying the elements that prevent a reduction in, for example, manpower, change-over times, campaign lengths, or lot sizes. This type of waste is often found in the Operations activities rather than the Processing activities.

== See also ==
- Lean manufacturing
- Lean software development
- Agile software development
- Total quality management
- Theory of constraints
