= Taiichi Ohno =

Japanese businessman and engineer (1912–1990)

- 大野耐一
- Born: February 29, 1912; Dalian, China
- Died: May 28, 1990 (aged 78); Toyota City, Japan
- Citizenship: Japan (from parents)
- Education: Nagoya Technical School
- Occupations: Industrial engineer; Businessman
- Employers: Toyota Boshoku; Toyota Motor Company
- Known for: Toyota Production System
- Title: vice president Toyota Motor Company
- Father: Ichizō Ōno
- Awards: Order of the Rising Sun § 3rd Class, Gold Rays with Neck Ribbon (1982)

Ohno Taiichi (大野耐一, Ōno Taiichi; February 29, 1912 – May 28, 1990) was a Japanese industrial engineer and businessman. He is considered to be the father of the Toyota Production System, which inspired Lean Manufacturing in the U.S. He devised the seven wastes (or muda in Japanese) as part of this system. He wrote several books about the system, including Toyota Production System: Beyond Large-Scale Production.

== Life ==
Born in 1912 in Manchuria, and a graduate of the Nagoya Technical High School (Japan), he joined the Toyoda family's Toyoda Spinning upon graduation in 1932 during the Great Depression thanks to the relations of his father to Kiichiro Toyoda, the son of Toyota's founding father Sakichi Toyoda. He moved to the Toyota motor company in 1943 where he worked as a shop-floor supervisor in the engine manufacturing shop of the plant, and gradually rose through the ranks to become an executive.

== Influence ==
Ohno's principles influenced areas outside of manufacturing, and have been extended into the service arena. For example, the field of sales process engineering has shown how the concept of Just In Time (JIT) can improve sales, marketing, and customer service processes.

== See also ==
- Shigeo Shingo (新郷 重雄, Shingō Shigeo)
- Just In Time (JIT)
- Lean manufacturing

== Published works ==
- 大野, 耐一 (1978). Toyotaseisanhōshiki: Datsu kibo no keiei o mezashite トヨタ生産方式 : 脱規模の経営をめざして [Toyota Production System: Aiming for a shift away from scale management] (in Japanese). ダイヤモンド. JPNO 78019200.
  - Ohno, Taiichi (1988). Toyota Production System: Beyond Large-Scale Production. Productivity Press. ISBN 0-915299-14-3.
- 大野, 耐一 (1982). Ōno taiichi no genba keiei 大野耐一の現場経営 [Taiichi Ohno's on-site management] (in Japanese). 日本能率協会. JPNO 82055236.
  - Ohno, Taiichi (1988). Workplace Management. Productivity Press. ISBN 0-915299-19-4.
- 大野, 耐一 (2001). Ōno taiichi no genba keiei 大野耐一の現場経営 [Taiichi Ohno's Workplace Management] (in Japanese) (新装 ed.). 日本能率協会. ISBN 4-8207-1582-8. JPNO 20176148.
  - Ohno, Taiichi (2007). Taiichi Ohno's Workplace Management. Translated by Miller, Jon. Gemba Press. ISBN 0-9786387-5-1.
  - Ohno, Taiichi (2012). Taiichi Ohno's Workplace Management (Special 100th Birthday ed.). McGraw Hill. ISBN 978-0-9786387-5-7.
