= Visual workplace =

Continuous improvement paradigm

The visual workplace is a continuous improvement paradigm that is closely related to lean manufacturing, the Toyota Production System (TPS), and operational excellence yet offers its own comprehensive methodology that aims for significant financial and cultural improvement gains. Introduced by Gwendolyn Galsworth in her 1997 book Visual Systems, this system integrates and codifies the many iterations of visuality in the world of continuous improvement.

== Brief history of visual information sharing ==
Visual communication rests on the natural inclination of humans to use pictures, graphics, and other images to quickly and simply convey meaning and understand information. For instance, look at the practices and applications that civil engineers have developed to handle complex human interaction on our roads and highways, as well as the entire field of wayfinding in public spaces.

The same logic eventually migrated into the workplace, notably in post-war Japan, and most saliently at Toyoda Motors where visual applications (visual devices) became a commonplace element in the Toyota Production System (TPS). Other leading companies in Japan, such as Canon and Okidata, adopted many of the same practices. However, while visibility was clearly a part of Japan's success solution, it was only noticed—or cited in the literature—as a generalized principle and not a codified system or a framework of thinking. For example, Robert W. Hall, in his 1983 book, Zero Inventories, states: "Establishing visibility of all forms of production problems is very important. ... The entire idea is instant communication."

Specifically, Japan's JIT (just-in-time) manufacturing approach had an easy-to-understand visual interface: andon (stacked lights), kanban (pick-up tickets for control material quantity), color-coding (to make the match between items), scheduling boards for daily production, easy-to-read labels on shelving, and lines on the floor to trace out locations.

Japanese master practitioners also noted that visual devices made it easy to see the difference between normal and abnormal: "... abnormal conditions and problems need to be obvious enough to catch people's attention. Because of the emphasis on visual methods for quick information transfer, the practice is called 'management by sight' or 'visual control'." Suzaki also compared the responsiveness of a well-tuned production system with the way the human body responds to stimuli and problems: "... Corrective action is taken right away, just as our muscles pull our hand away when we touch a hot plate."

Michel Greif's book, The Visual Factory, adopted the name for the first time, though Greif's theme focused primarily on the ability of visual applications to increase the interest of hourly workers in their own performance and their participation in company improvement activities.

== A codified system of visual functions ==
Throughout this period (1983–1991), Gwendolyn Galsworth was head of training and development at Productivity Inc. in Cambridge, Massachusetts, a publishing, training, and consulting firm known for bringing the work of Japan's manufacturing leaders to the United States. Galsworth headed study missions to Japan and observed visuality in Japan first-hand. She also had the opportunity of working one-on-one with many of Japan's seminal thinkers, including Taiichi Ohno, Ryuji Fukuda, and Shigeo Shingo. Shingo personally tasked Galsworth with developing his mistake proofing/poka-yoke methodology for western companies. It was the synthesis of all these factors and influences that led Galsworth to develop and codify the many threads of visuality into a coherent methodology of the visual workplace, an overall operational strategy and philosophy geared to help organizations continually achieve their goals through visual devices and systems.

Galsworth has authored books on workplace visuality and trained practitioners globally. The methodology incorporates continuous improvement principles, using visual systems to streamline operations and engage employees.

== Basic principles ==
While virtually all major improvement paradigms in use in the West incorporate some element of visuality, the entire codified set of visual principles and practices, from the foundation of 5S through to visual guarantees (poka-yoke), rests on this definition: "The visual workplace is a self-ordering, self-explaining, self-regulating, and self-improving work environment—where what is supposed to happen does happen, on time, every time, day or night—because of visual devices."

A visual workplace is defined by devices designed to visually share information about organizational operations in order to make human and machine performance safer, more exact, more repeatable, and more reliable. The more the process becomes visual, the more production velocity increases.

This is accomplished in parallel with generating new levels of employee engagement and contribution, which in turn lead to improved alignment within the enterprise and significant bottom line benefits. In an effective visual workplace, this level of information can be seen and understood without coaching, supervision or the need for an explanation—at best, without speaking a word.

The key principle is to install vital information visually as close to the point of use as possible. When a step-by-step methodology is applied, the visual workplace targets the elimination of the seventh waste, motion, defined as moving without working.

Originally implemented and refined in manufacturing settings, the concept of the visual workplace is now taking hold in such wide-ranging venues as libraries and hospitals.
