= Operational efficiency =

Measurement of resource allocation

In a business context, operational efficiency is a measurement of resource allocation and can be defined as the ratio between an output gained from the business and an input to run a business operation. When improving operational efficiency, the output to input ratio improves.

Inputs would typically be money (cost), people (measured either as headcount or as the number of full-time equivalents) or time/effort. Outputs would typically be money (revenue, margin, cash), new customers, customer loyalty, market differentiation, production, innovation, quality, speed & agility, complexity or opportunities.

The terms "operational efficiency", "efficiency" and "productivity" are often used interchangeably. An explanation of the difference between efficiency and (total factor) productivity is found in "An Introduction to Efficiency and Productivity Analysis". To complicate the meaning, operational excellence, which is about continuous improvement, not limited to efficiency, is occasionally used when meaning operational efficiency. Occasionally, operating excellence is also used with the same meaning as operational efficiency.

== Measuring operational efficiency ==
Improving operational efficiency begins with measuring it. Since operational efficiency is about the output to input ratio, it must be measured on both the input and output side. Quite often, company management is measuring primarily on the input side, e.g., the unit production cost or the man hours required to produce one unit. Even though important, input indicators like the unit production cost should not be seen as sole indicators of operational efficiency. When measuring operational efficiency, a company should define, measure and track a number of performance indicators on both the input and output side. The exact definition of these performance indicators varies between industries, but typically covers these categories:

- Input: Operational expenditure (OPEX), capital expenditure (CAPEX), people (measured either as headcount including headcount of partners, or as total number of full-time equivalents)
- Output: Revenue, customer numbers/distribution between segments, quality, growth, customer satisfaction

== Comparing operational efficiency ==
If the intention is to compare numbers with others through benchmarking it is important to define, measure and track performance indicators for load and complexity as well. Even within the same industry, customer behaviour might e.g. be significantly different between two markets (or two countries) leading to one company having to assign more resources and cost to handling of customers. Not measuring such load and complexity factors might lead to incorrect conclusions on operational efficiency.

When interpreting the quantitative results of the benchmarking, it is important to consider the strategic differentiation:

"Cost is generated by performing activities, and cost advantage arises from performing particular activities more efficiently than competitors. Similarly, differentiation arises from both the choice of activities and how they are performed."

When qualitatively interpreting the quantitative results of the benchmarking, one has to take the company strategy into consideration - as well as the individual strategies of the other members of the peer group. If not done, quantitative results that are a consequence of strategy, not of inefficiency, can't be eliminated.

One company might have a strategy to differentiate with low price. For that company, it is critical to have low unit production costs and high efficiency in distribution. For another company, differentiating with premium quality, the unit production cost is not that critical (but still important to know, of course). Instead, it is critical to have satisfied and loyal customers and a high absolute revenue per customer. Understanding actual quality levels is also key.

== Improving operational efficiency ==
When improving operational efficiency, companies have a few alternatives. The most common are:

- Same for less, i.e. same output for less input
- More for same, i.e. more output for same input
- Much more for more, i.e. much more output for more input

It is a common misconception that costs, in absolute terms, are always reduced when improving operational efficiency. This is true for the “same for less” alternative, but not for the other two alternatives. It can be operationally efficient to increase costs, as long as the output increases by a greater amount.

One example of a same for less alternative is when a manufacturing company reduces its total personnel (and thereby personnel cost) while still producing the same volume of goods. This can e.g. be achieved through centralization, automation or optimization of working processes.

An example of a “more for same” alternative is a manufacturing company reducing its output of faulty products (and thereby reducing after-sales costs) without using additional money or resources. This can, for example, be achieved through the use of quality management systems, by addressing quality in existing training programs for personnel, or by introducing higher quality requirements when prolonging subcontractor agreements.

An example of a “much more for more” alternative is when a manufacturing company invests in a new production plant that enables it to produce products with greater refinement than it could in its older plants. It can then sell these products at a premium price that more than compensates for the additional costs. Another example of “much more for more” is when a service company invests in expanding its customer service to increase customer satisfaction and customer loyalty.
