= Kata =

Detailed choreographed patterns of movements in martial arts

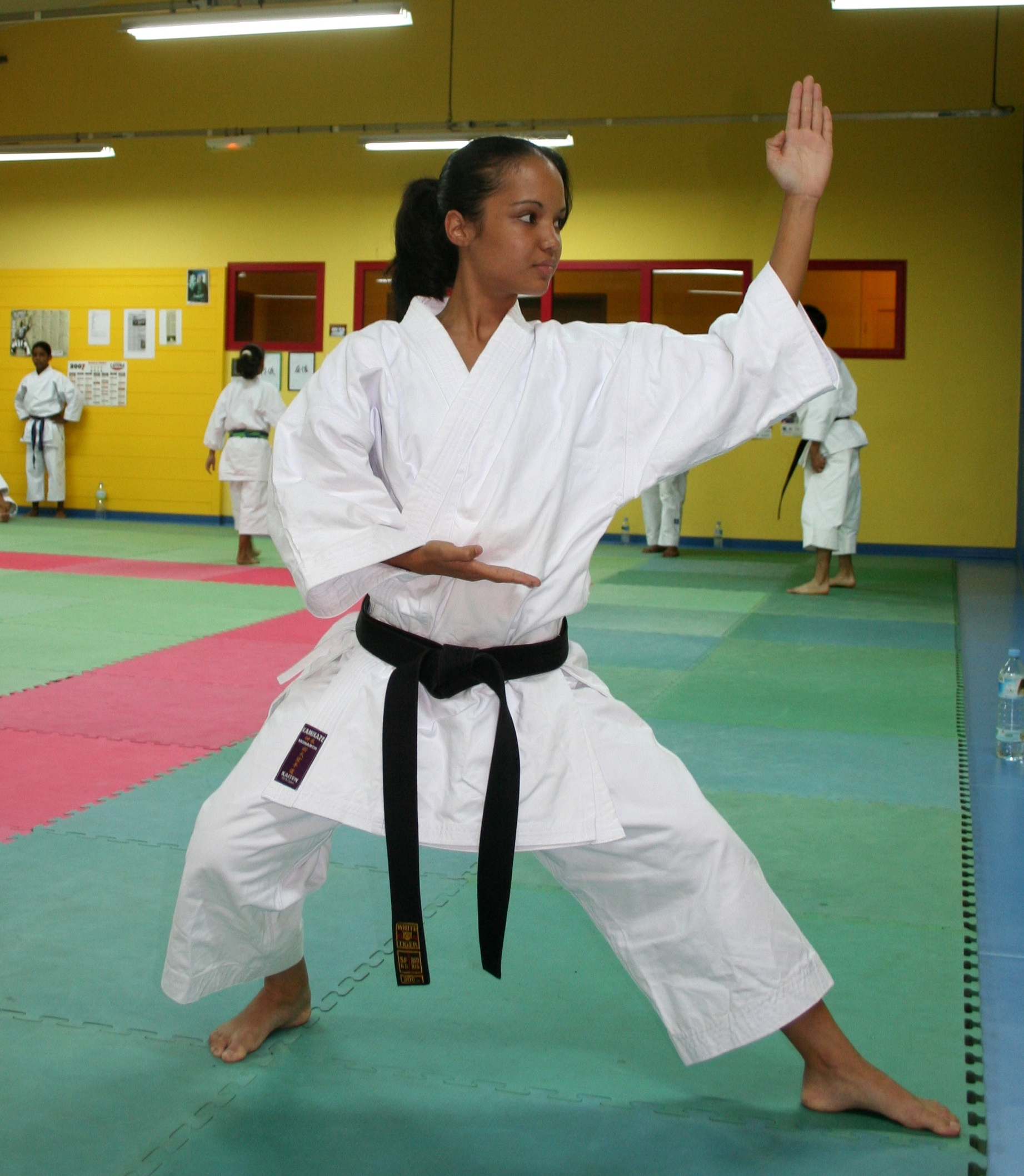
- 2005 cadet world karate champion Emmanuelle Fumonde performing a Kata, called Kanku Dai.

Japanese name
- Kanji: 1. 型 2. 形
- Hiragana: かた
Transcriptions
- Revised Hepburn: kata

Kata is a Japanese word (型 or 形) meaning 'form'. It refers to a detailed choreographed pattern of martial arts movements. It can also be reviewed within groups and in unison when training. It is practiced in Japanese martial arts as a way to memorize and perfect the movements being executed. Korean martial arts with Japanese influence (hapkido, Tang Soo Do) use the derived term hyeong (hanja: 形) and also the term pumsae (hanja: 品勢 hangeul: 품새).

Kata are also used in many traditional Japanese arts such as theatre forms like kabuki and schools of tea ceremony (chadō), but are most commonly known in the martial arts. Kata are used by most Japanese and Okinawan martial arts, such as iaido, judo, kendo, kenpo, and karate.

== Background ==
Kata originally were teaching and training methods by which successful combat techniques were preserved and passed on. Practicing kata allowed a company of persons to engage in a struggle using a systematic approach, rather by practicing in a repetitive manner the learner develops the ability to execute those techniques and movements in a natural, reflex-like manner. Systematic practice does not mean permanently rigid. The goal is to internalize the movements and techniques of a kata so they can be executed and adapted under different circumstances, without thought or hesitation. A novice's actions will look uneven and difficult, while a master's appear simple and smooth.

Kata is a loanword in English, from the 1950s in reference to the judo kata due to Jigoro Kano, and from the 1970s also of karate kata; but the word has come to be used as a generic term for "forms" in martial arts in general, or even figuratively applied to other fields.

== Japanese martial arts ==
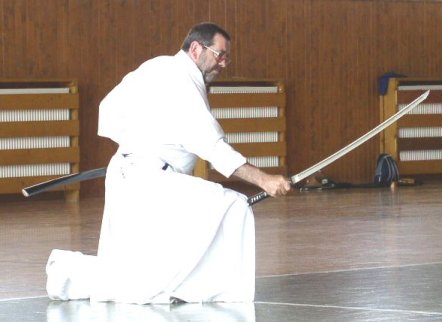
Solo training of kata is the primary form of practice in some martial arts, such as iaido.

In Japanese martial arts practice, kata is often seen as an essential partner to randori training (sparring), with one complementing the other. However, the actual type and frequency of kata versus randori training varies from art to art. In iaido, solo kata using the Japanese sword (katana) comprises almost all of the training. Whereas in judo, kata training is de-emphasized and usually only prepared for dan grading.

In kenjutsu, paired kata at the beginners level can appear to be stilted. At higher levels serious injury is prevented only by a high sensitivity of both participants to important concepts being taught and trained for. These include timing and distance, with the kata practised at realistic speed. This adjustability of kata training is found in other Japanese arts with roles of attacker and defender often interchanging within the sequence.

In budō and bujutsu, there are two roles: shidachi (受太刀, lit. '"doing/receiving sword"') and uchidachi (打太刀, lit. '"striking/attacking sword"'). In modern Kendo shidachi is normally written as 仕太刀. The shidachi is the disciple and the uchidachi their instructor.

Many martial arts use kata for public demonstrations and in competitions, awarding points for such aspects of technique as style, balance, timing, and verisimilitude (appearance of being real).

=== Karate ===
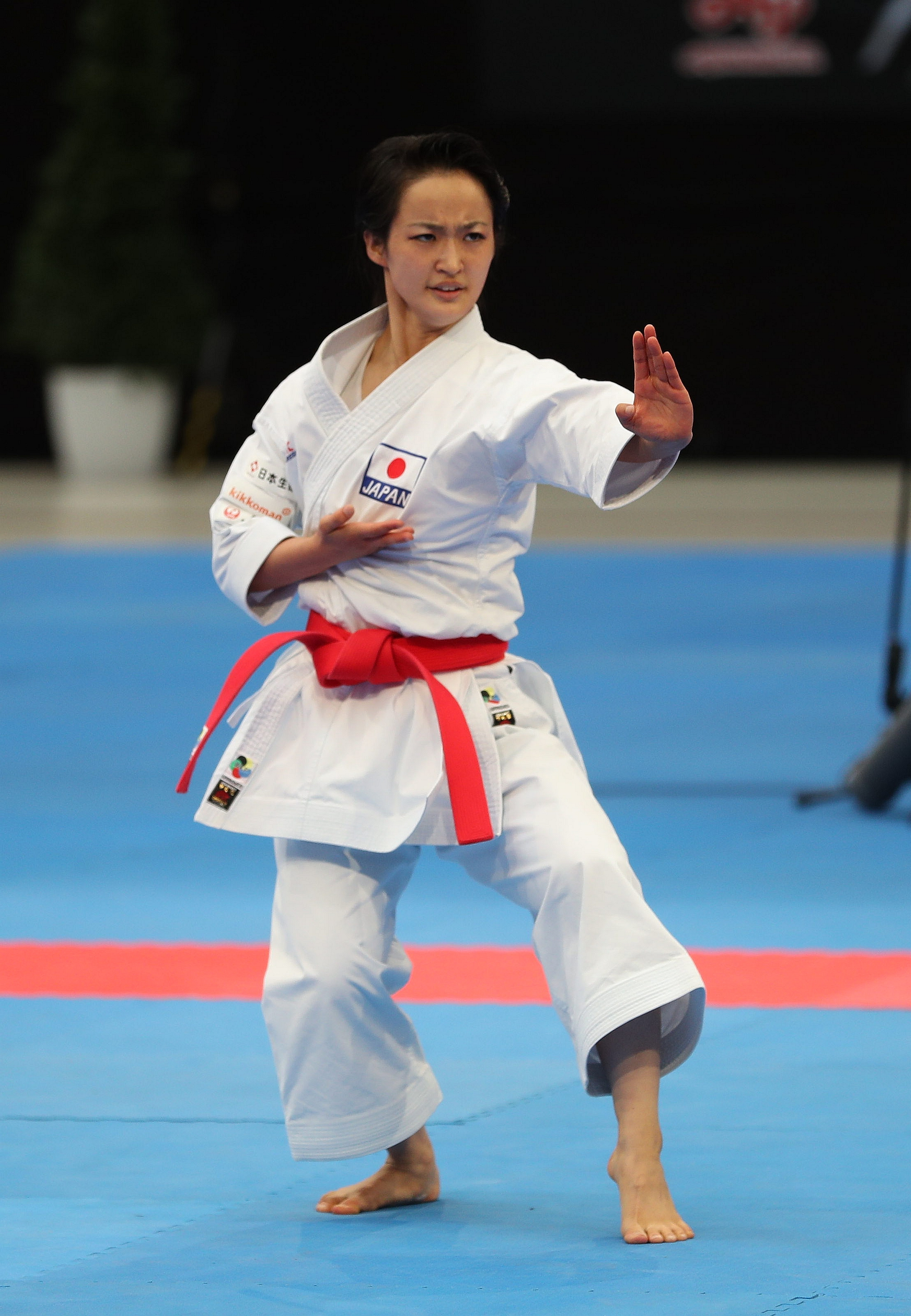
Kiyou Shimizu's female Kata at the 2018 Karate1 Premier League in Berlin.

The most popular image associated with kata is that of a karate practitioner performing a series of punches and kicks in the air. The kata are executed as a specified series of approximately 20 to 70 moves, generally with stepping and turning, while attempting to maintain perfect form. There are perhaps 100 kata across the various forms of karate, each with many minor variations. The number of moves in a kata may be referred to in the name of the kata, e.g., Gojū Shiho, which means "54 steps." The practitioner is generally counselled to visualize the enemy attacks, and his responses, as actually occurring, and karateka are often told to "read" a kata, to explain the imagined events. Kata can contain techniques beyond the superficially obvious ones. The study of the meaning of the movements is referred to as the bunkai, meaning analysis, of the kata.

One explanation of the use of kata is as a reference guide for a set of moves. Not to be used following that "set" pattern but to keep the movements "filed". After learning these kata, this set of learned skills can then be used in a sparring scenario (particularly without points). The main objective here is to try out different combinations of techniques in a safe environment to ultimately find out how to defeat your opponent.

Recently, with the spread of extreme martial arts, or XMA, a style of kata called CMX kata has formed. These kata are performed in tournaments and include gymnastics related elements, such as backflips, cartwheels, and splits. These kata can also be performed with weapons such as the bō staff.

=== Judo ===
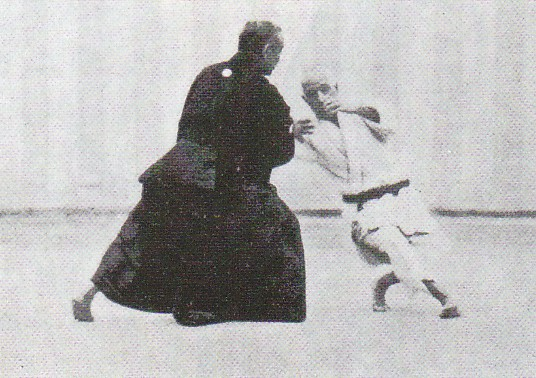
Koshiki-no-kata by Kano (left) and Yamashita (right)

Judo has several kata, mostly created in the late 19th century by Kano Jigoro, the founder of judo. The judo kata involve two participants. Judo kata preserve a number of techniques that are not permitted in competition or in randori, including punches, kicks, and the use of the katana and other weapons. The study of kata is usually begun typically at around the green belt level. The most commonly studied judo kata is Nage-no-kata, which consists of fifteen throwing techniques. The Katame-no-kata is composed of pinning techniques, chokes, and joint locks. Kime-no-kata is a long kata consisting of self-defense techniques against both unarmed attacks, and attacks with swords and knives.

== Non-Japanese martial arts ==
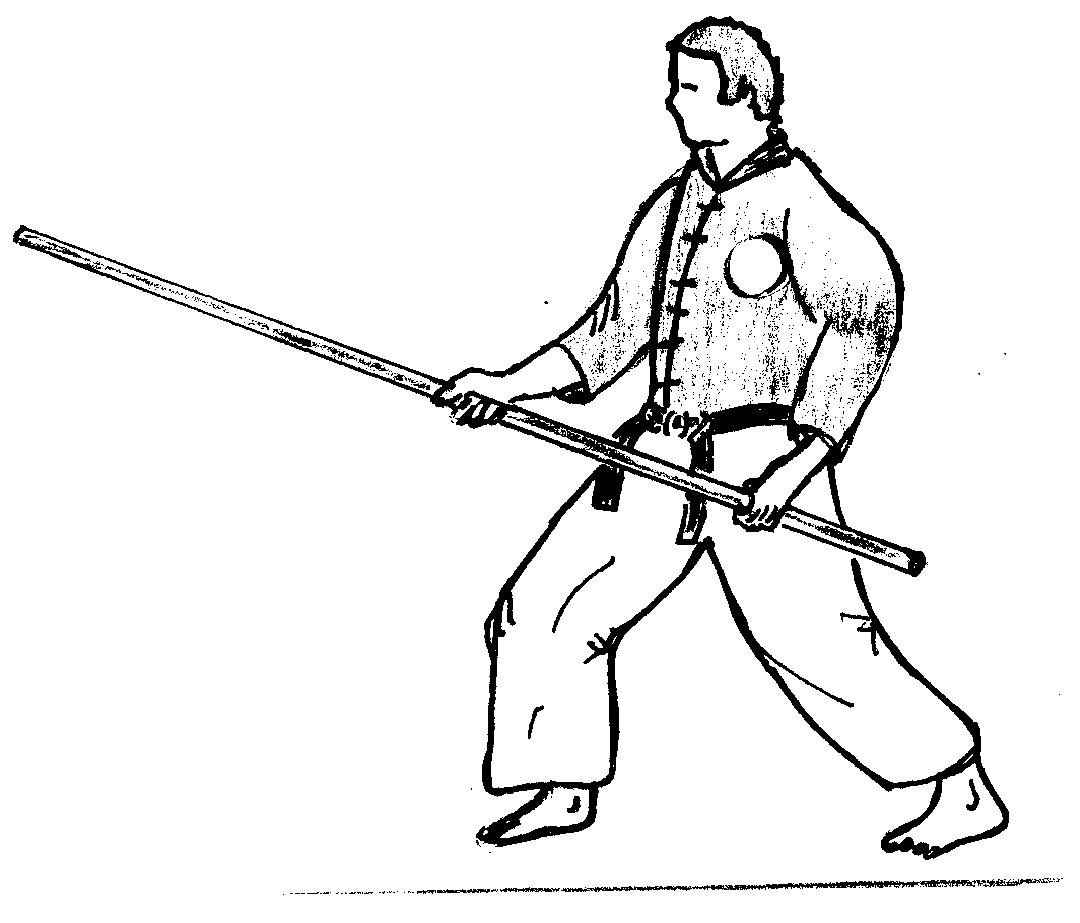
Aka with stick (4 Winds)

While the Japanese term is most well known in the English language, forms are by no means exclusive to Japan. They have been recorded in China as early as the Tang dynasty, and are referred to in Mandarin as taolu.

South and Southeast Asian martial arts incorporate both preset and freestyle forms. In silat these are referred to as jurus and tari respectively. Malay folklore credits the introduction of forms to the Buddhist monk Bodhidharma.

In Korean martial arts such as taekwondo and Tang Soo Do, the word hyung or hyeong is usually employed, though in some cases other words are used. The International Taekwon-Do Federation uses the word tul, while the World Taekwondo Federation uses the word poomsae or simply the English translations "pattern" or "form." Taekwondo patterns have multiple variations including Palgwe and the more popular Taeguk forms used by the WTF. Forms are included in certain taekwondo competitions and are a key element of gradings.

In Sanskrit, forms are known either as yudhan (combat form) or pentra (tactical deployment). Other Asian martial arts refer to forms by various terms specific to their respective languages, such as the Burmese word aka, the Vietnamese quyen and the Kashmiri khawankay.

In historical European martial arts and their modern reconstructions, there are forms, plays, drills and flourishes.

== Outside martial arts ==
More recently kata has come to be used in English in a more general or figurative sense, referring to any basic form, routine, or pattern of behavior that is practised to various levels of mastery.

In Japanese language kata (though written as 方) is a frequently used suffix meaning “way of doing,” with emphasis on the form and order of the process. Other meanings are “training method” and “formal exercise.” The goal of a painter's practising, for example, is to merge their consciousness with their brush; the potter's with their clay; the garden designer's with the materials of the garden. Once such mastery is achieved, the theory goes, the doing of a thing perfectly is as easy as thinking it.

Kata is a term used by some programmers in the Software Craftsmanship movement. Computer programmers who call themselves "Software Craftsmen" will write 'Kata' - small snippets of code that they write in one sitting, sometimes repeatedly, often daily, in order to build muscle memory and practise their craft.

In 1999, the term was used by Dave Thomas, co-author of the book The Pragmatic Programmer. The concept was implemented by Laurent Bossavit and Emmanuel Gaillot who talked about it at XP2005 in Sheffield (UK). Following this conference, Robert C. Martin described the concept and initial usages in his article "The Programming Dojo".

Katas are also used by magicians to practice cyclical sequences of sleight of hand moves.

One of the things that characterize an organization's culture is its kata – its routines of thinking and practice. Edgar Schein suggests an organization's culture helps it cope with its environment, and one meaning of kata is, "a way to keep two things in sync or harmony with one another." A task for leaders and managers is to create and maintain the organizational culture through consistent role modeling, teaching, and coaching, which is in many ways analogous to how kata are taught in the martial arts.

Toyota Kata is a 2009 management book by Mike Rother aiming to establish a routine for establishing a continuous improvement process.

== See also ==
- Mushin (mental state)
- Etude
- Practice (learning method)
- Procedural memory
