= 5S (methodology) =

Workplace organisation method

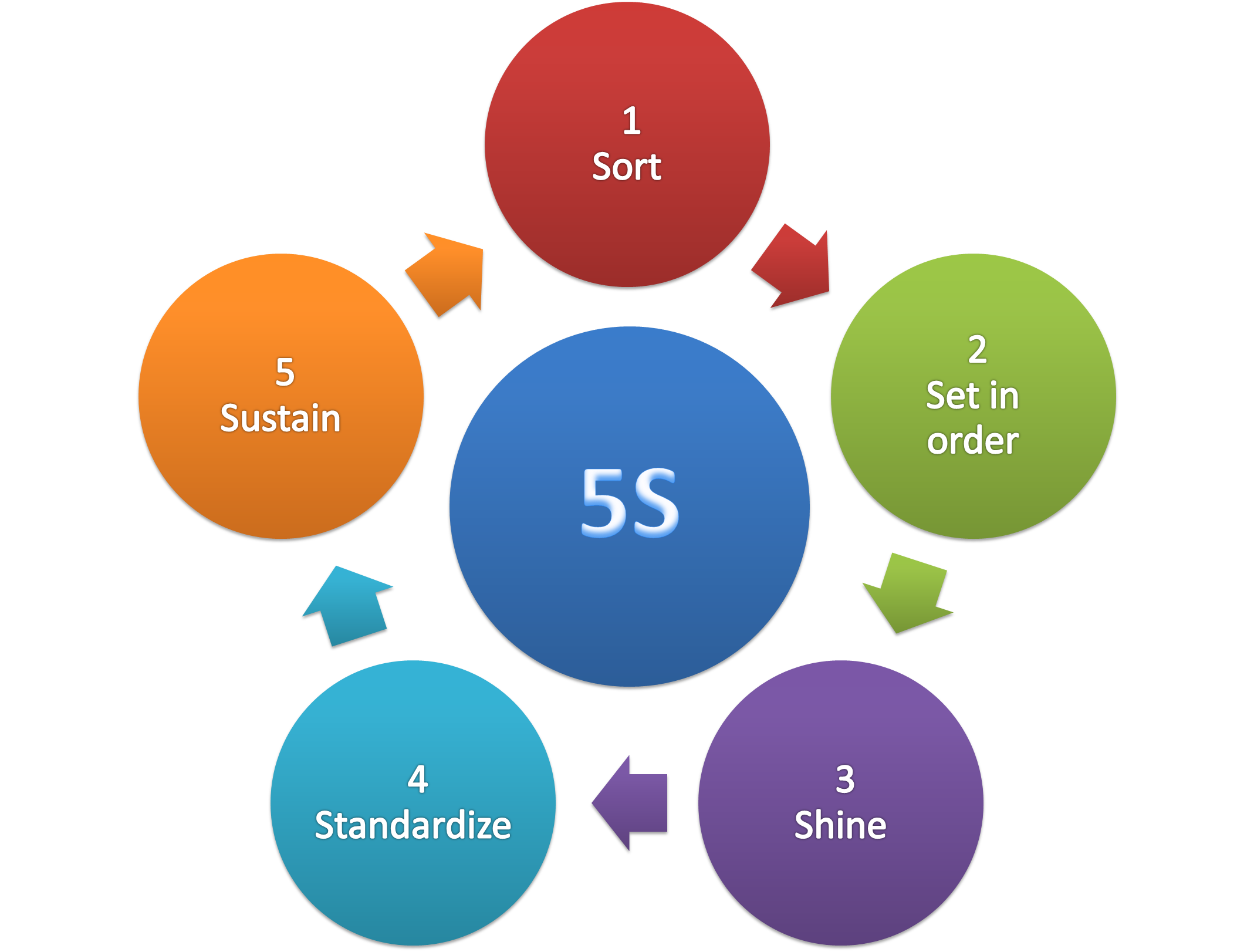
5S methodology

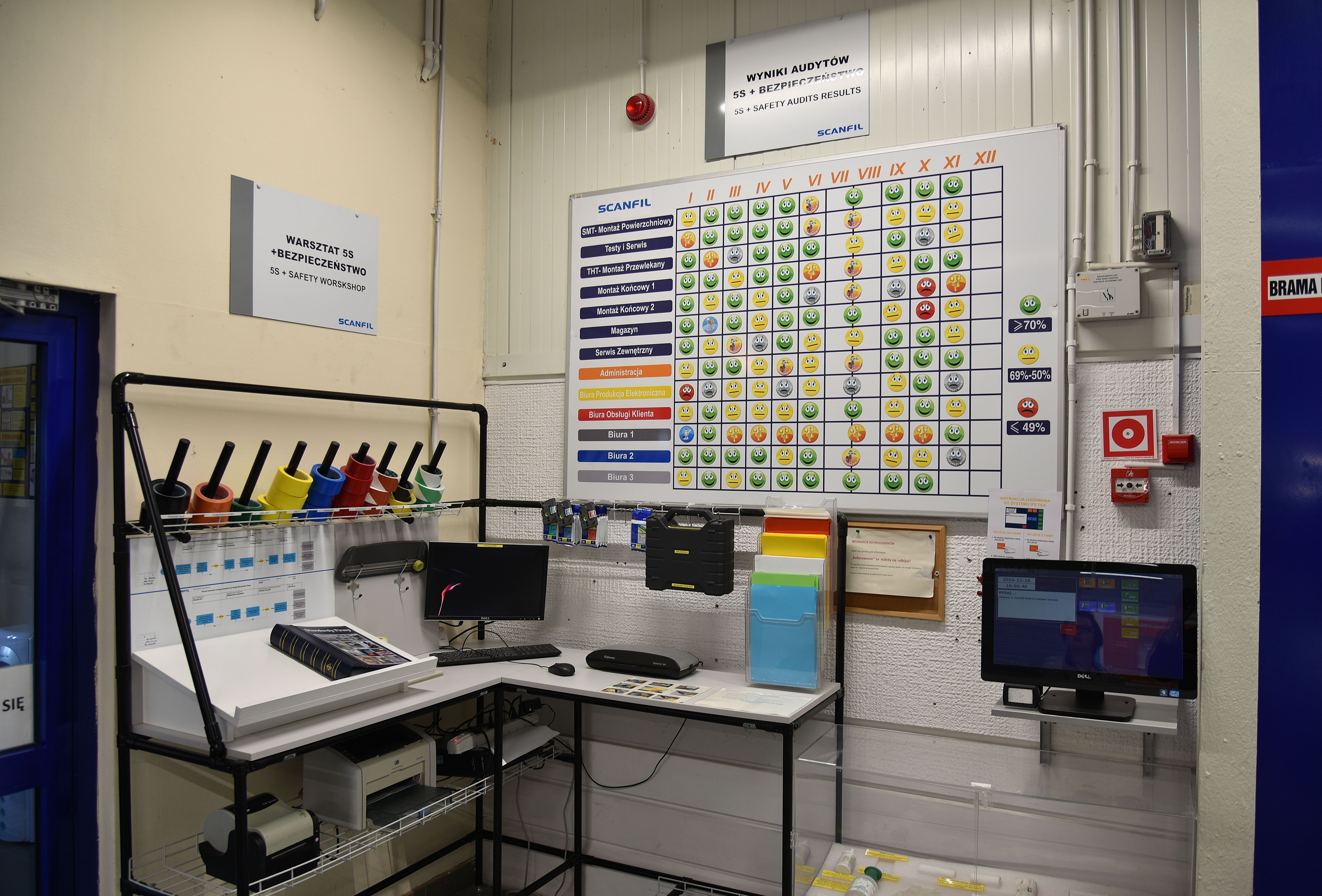
5S resource corner at Scanfil Poland factory in Sieradz

5S (Five S) is a workplace organization method that uses a list of five Japanese words: seiri (整理), seiton (整頓), seisō (清掃), seiketsu (清潔), and shitsuke (躾). These terms are often translated as 'sort', 'set in order', 'shine', 'standardize', and 'sustain'. The list describes how to organize a work space for efficiency and effectiveness by identifying and sorting the items used, maintaining the area and items, and sustaining the new organizational system. The decision-making process usually comes from a dialogue about standardization, which builds understanding among employees of how they should do the work.

In some organizations, 5S has become 6S, the sixth element being safety (safe).

Other than a specific stand-alone methodology, 5S is frequently viewed as an element of a broader construct known as visual control, visual workplace, or visual factory. Under those (and similar) terminologies, Western companies were applying underlying concepts of 5S before publication, in English, of the formal 5S methodology. For example, a workplace-organization photo from Tennant Company (a Minneapolis-based manufacturer) quite similar to the one accompanying this article appeared in a manufacturing-management book in 1986.

== Origins ==
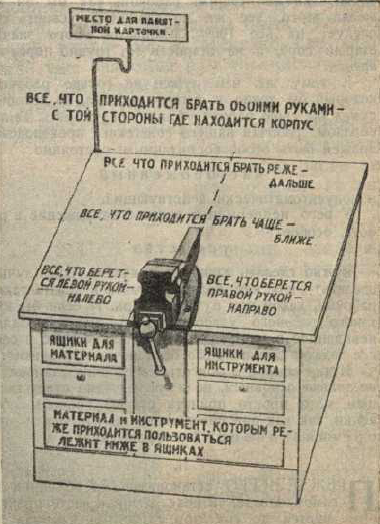
The scheme "Correct Arrangement of the Tool" from a USSR Central Institute of Labour instruction sheet, 1920–1924

5S was developed in Japan and has been identified as one of the techniques that enabled just-in-time manufacturing.

Two major frameworks for understanding and applying 5S to business environments have arisen, one proposed by Takahashi Osada, the other by Hiroyuki Hirano. Hirano's work, published in 1995, referred to five "pillars", which provided a structure to improve programs with a series of identifiable steps, each building on its predecessor.

Before this Japanese management framework, a similar "scientific management" was proposed by Alexey Gastev and the USSR Central Institute of Labour (CIT) in Moscow.

== Each S ==
There are five 5S phases. They can be translated to English as 'sort', 'set in order', 'shine', 'standardize', and 'sustain'. Other translations are possible, usually with English words starting with an S.

=== Sort (seiri 整理) ===
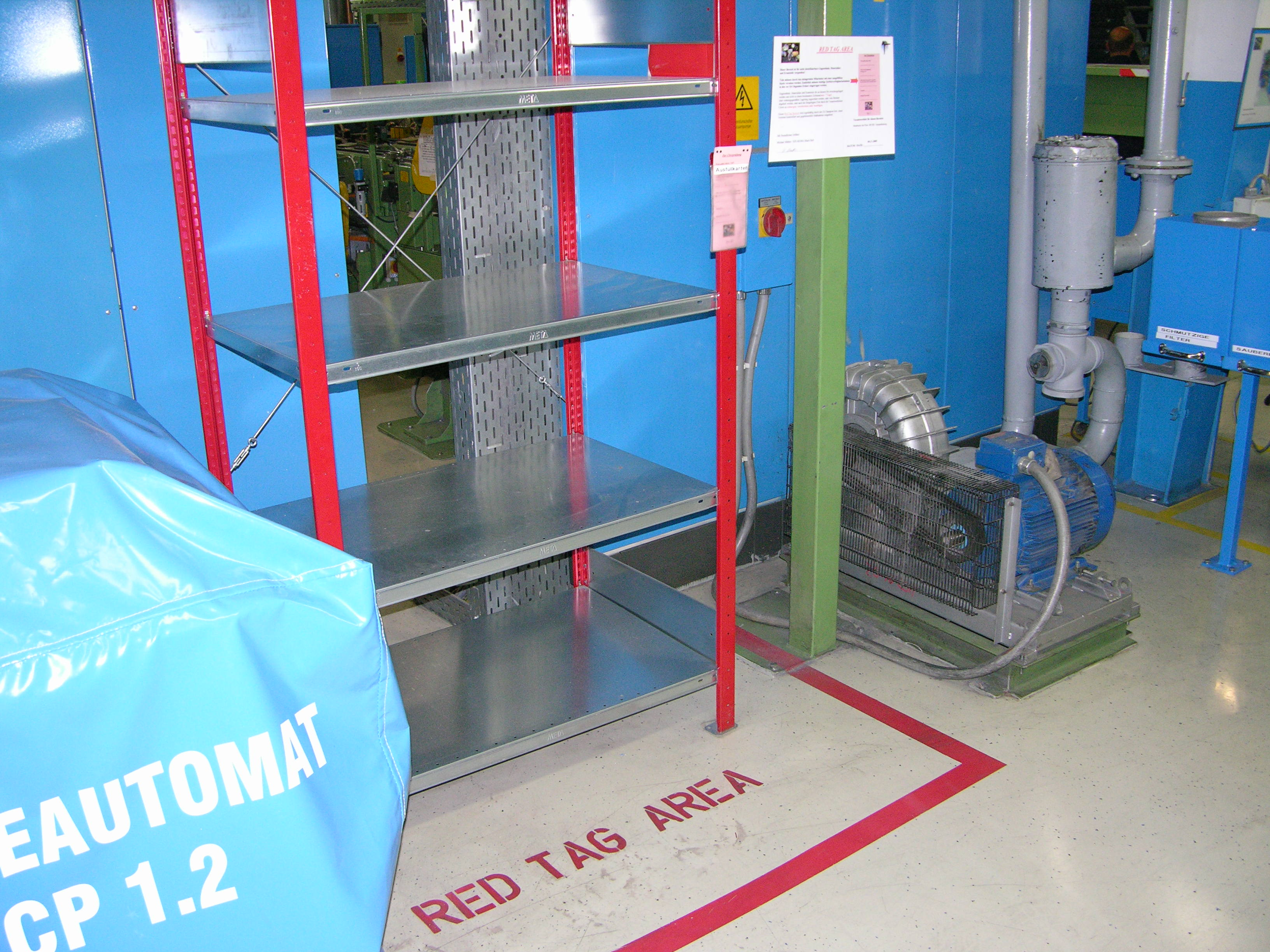
1S – a red tag area containing items awaiting removal

Seiri is sorting through all items in a location and removing all unnecessary items from the location. The terms "simplify" and "systematisation" are also used.

Goals:

- Reduce time lost looking for an item by reducing the number of unnecessary items.
- Reduce the chance of distraction by unnecessary items.
- Simplify inspection.
- Increase the amount of available, useful space.
- Increase safety by eliminating obstacles.

Implementation actions include:

- Checking all items in a location and evaluating whether or not their presence at the location is useful or necessary.
- Removing unnecessary items as soon as possible, placing those that cannot be removed immediately in a "red tag area" so that they can be easily removed later on.
- Keeping the working floor clear of materials except for those that are in use for production.

=== Set in order (seiton 整頓) ===
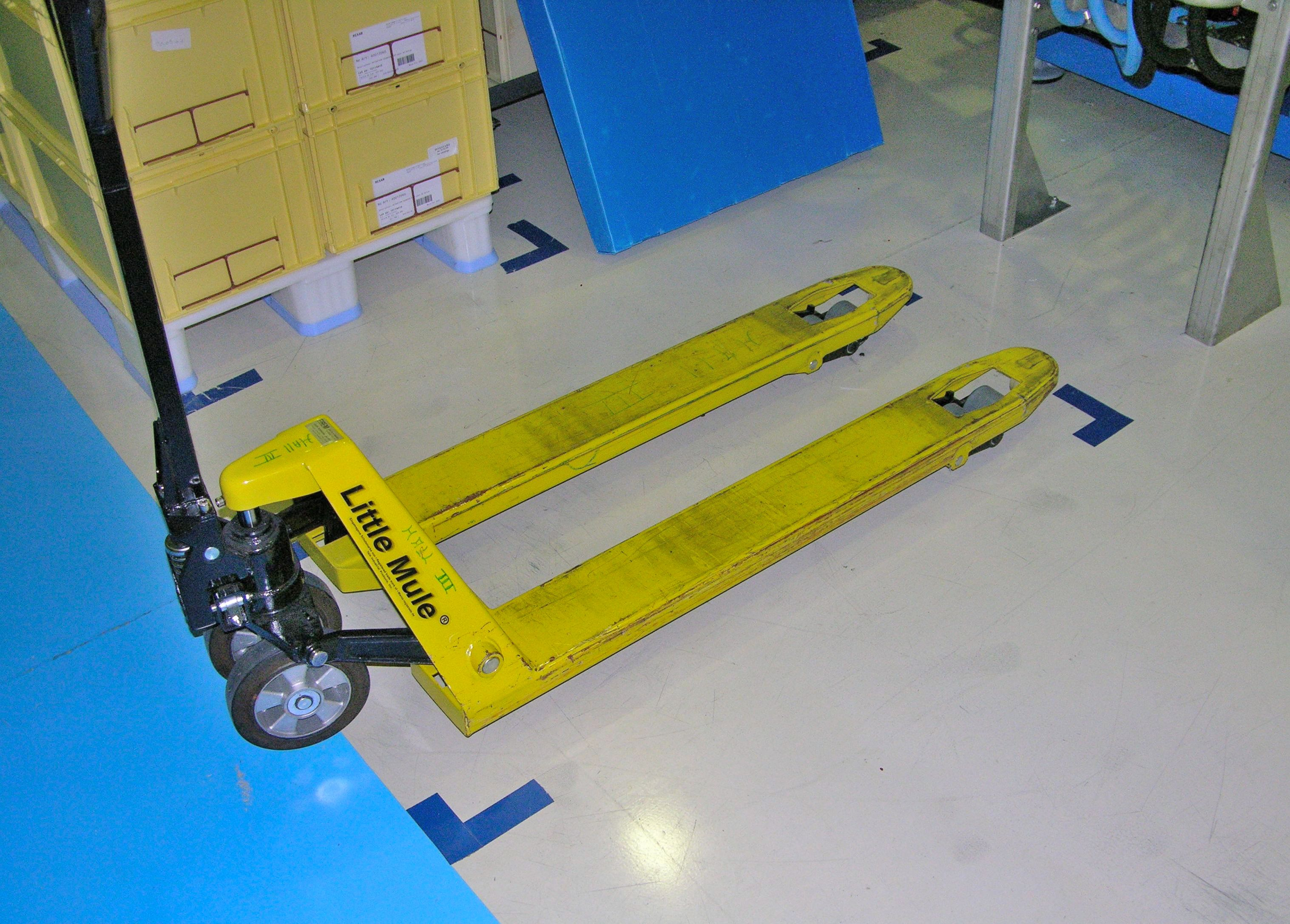
2S – simple floor marking

Seiton is sometimes shown as Straighten, but it is also known as Orderliness where writers are willing to substitute words without an S.

Seiton is putting all necessary items in the optimal place for fulfilling their function in the workplace.

Goal:

- Make the workflow smooth and easy.

Implementation actions include:

- Arranging work stations in such a way that all tooling/equipment is in close proximity, in an easy to reach spot, and in a logical order adapted to the work performed.
- Placing components according to their uses, with the frequently used components being nearest to the workplace.
- Arranging all necessary items so that they can be easily selected for use.
- Assigning fixed locations for items, using clear labels, marks or hints or foam tool outlines, so that items are easy to return to their correct location and so that it is easy to spot missing items.

=== Shine (seiso 清掃) ===
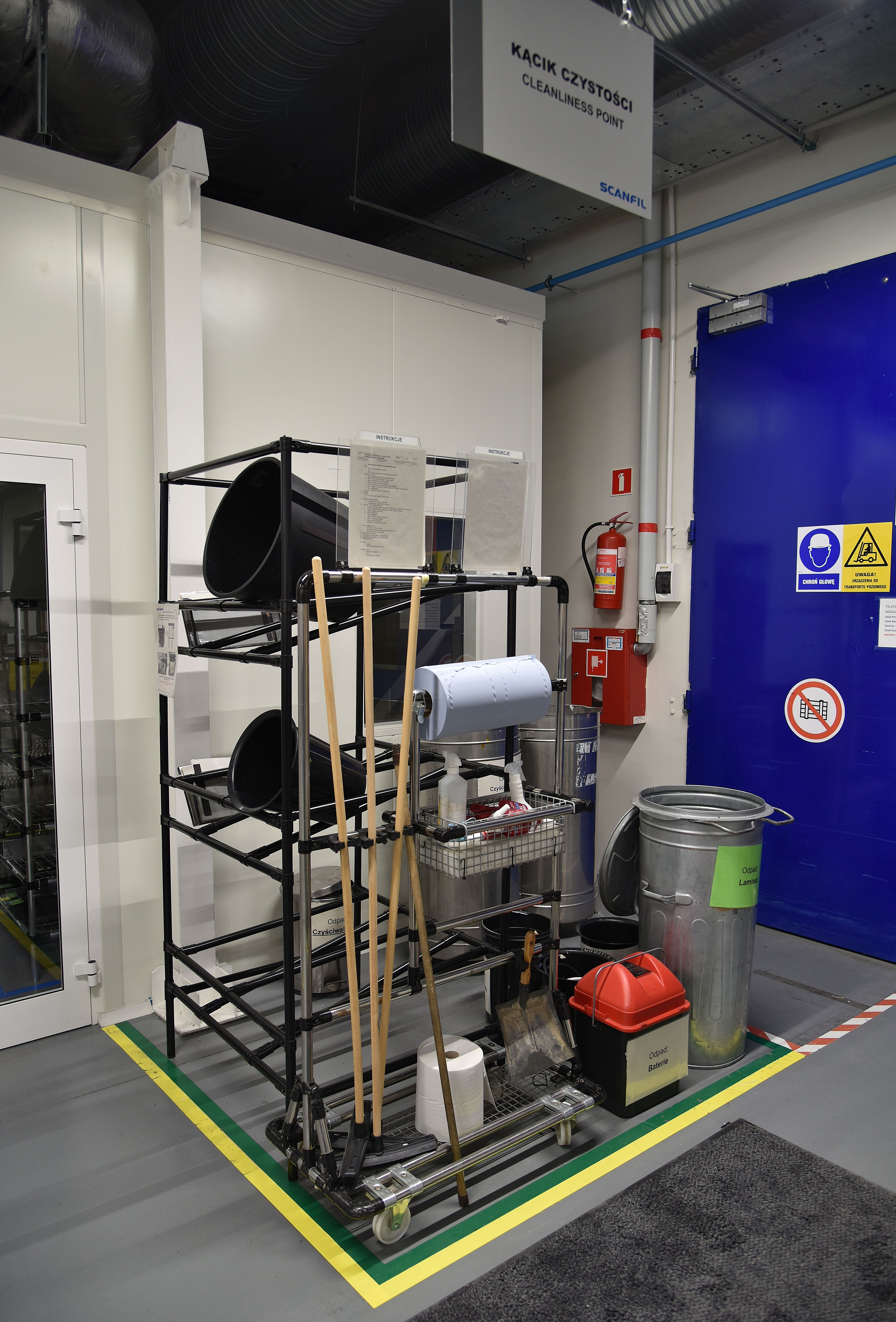
3S – cleanliness point with cleaning tools and resources

Seiso is sweeping or cleaning and inspecting the workplace, tools and machinery on a regular basis. Some writers refer to this as Cleanliness.

Goals:

- Improves the production process efficiency and safety, reduces waste, prevents errors and defects.
- Keep the workplace safe and easy to work in.
- Keep the workplace clean and pleasing to work in.
- When in place, anyone not familiar to the environment must be able to detect any problems within 15 meters (50 ft) in 5 seconds.

Implementation actions include:

- Cleaning the workplace and equipment on a daily basis, or at another appropriate (high frequency) cleaning interval.
- Inspecting the workplace and equipment while cleaning.

=== Standardize (seiketsu 清潔) ===
Although commonly rendered as 'standardize' in the 5S framework, this is a mistranslation of Seiketsu, which actually means 'to maintain hygiene and cleanliness'. Consequently, the original idea had no association with standardization or uniformity, which would be ill-suited to non-uniform tasks.

Goal:

- Establish procedures and schedules to ensure the cleanliness of workplace.

Implementation actions include:

- Developing a work structure that will support the new practices and make it part of the daily routine.
- Ensuring everyone knows their responsibilities of performing the sorting, organizing and cleaning.
- Using photos and visual controls to help keep everything as it should be.

=== Sustain/self-discipline (shitsuke しつけ) ===
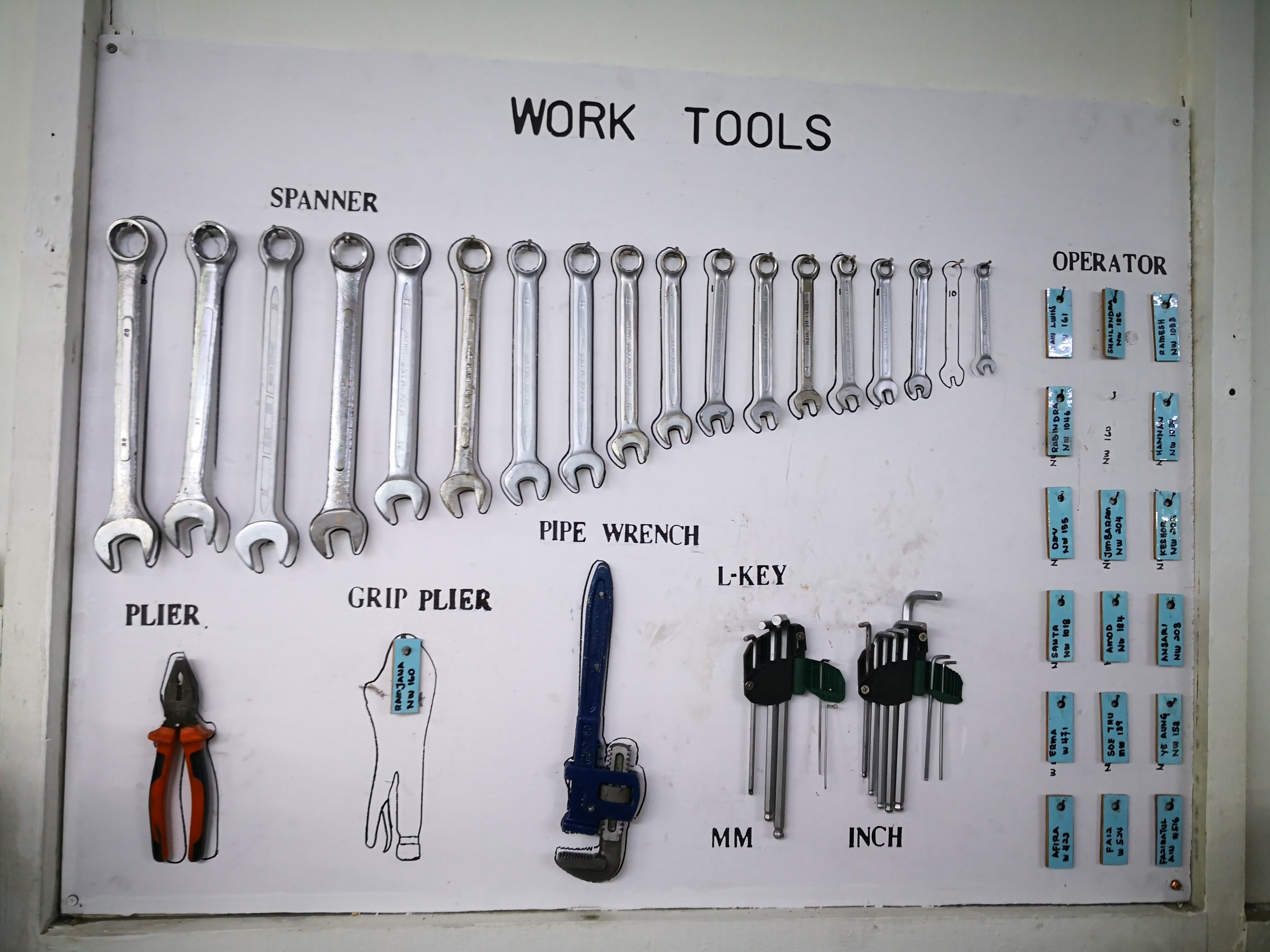
Shadow board (with tools' outlines) and worker's movement that is being used in production floor

Shitsuke, or sustain, involves the Self-discipline of the workers. The word is also translated as "do without being told", or "discipline".

Goal:

- Ensure that the 5S approach is followed.

Implementation actions include:

- Organizing training sessions.
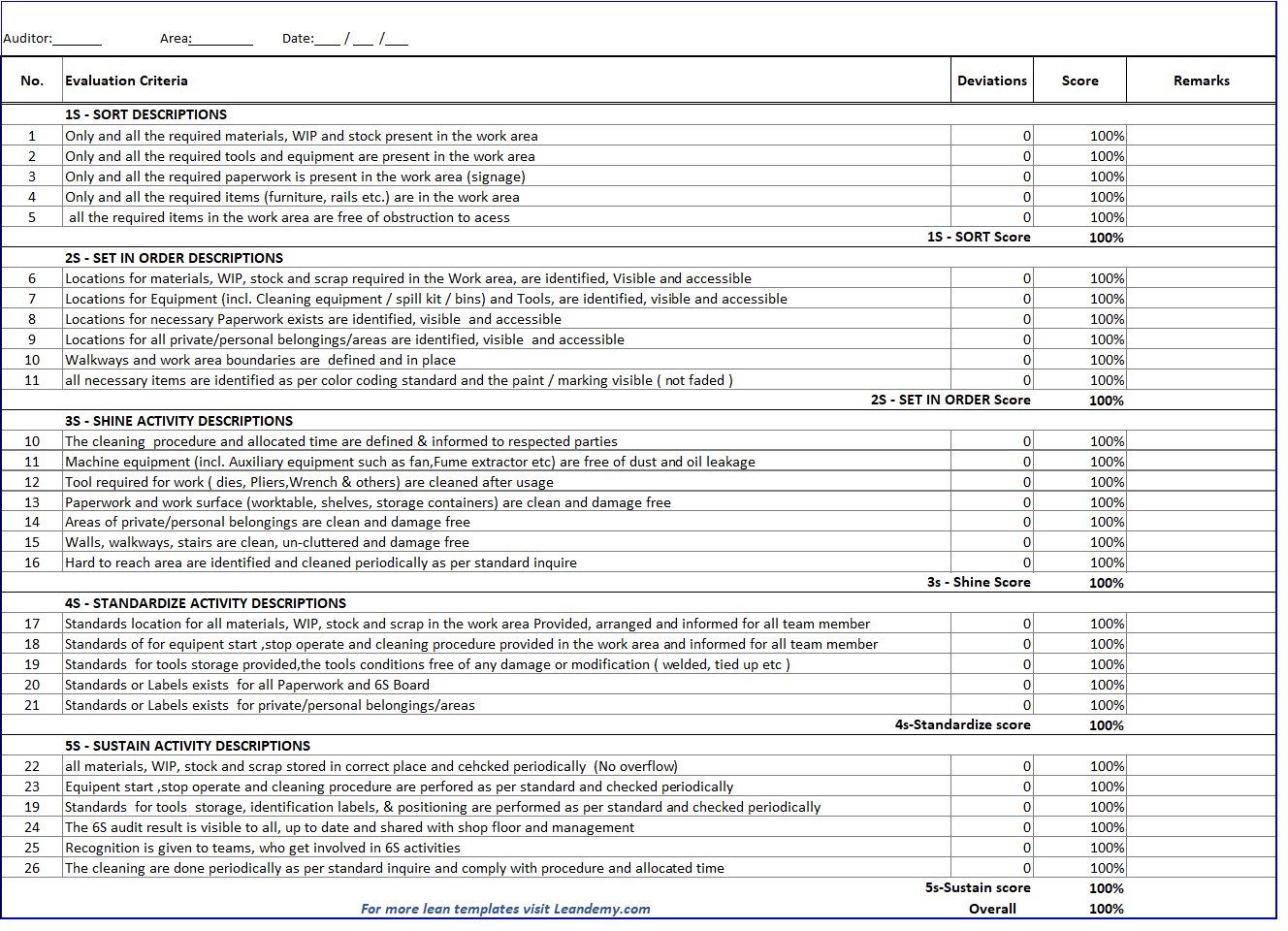
- Example of 5s audit checklist
  Performing regular audits using a 5S audit checklist, to ensure that all defined standards are being implemented and followed.
- Implementing improvements whenever possible, seeking worker inputs, which can be very valuable for identifying improvements.

== 7S ==
The 7S methodology incorporates 6S safety, adding a new element for oversight or spirit.

== Variety of applications ==
5S methodology has expanded from manufacturing and is now being applied to a wide variety of industries including health care, education, and government. Visual management and 5S can be particularly beneficial in health care because a frantic search for supplies to treat an in-trouble patient (a chronic problem in health care) can have dire consequences. Although the origins of the 5S methodology are in manufacturing, it can also be applied to knowledge economy work, with information, software, or media in the place of physical product.

== In lean product and process development ==
The output of engineering and design in a lean enterprise is information, the theory behind using 5S here is "Dirty, cluttered, or damaged surfaces attract the eye, which spends a fraction of a second trying to pull useful information from them every time we glance past. Old equipment hides the new equipment from the eye and forces people to ask which to use".

== See also ==
- Japanese aesthetics
- Just-in-time manufacturing
- Kaikaku
- Kaizen
- Kanban
- Lean manufacturing
- Muda
- Gogyo (traditional Japanese philosophy)
