= Toyota Kata =

Non-fiction work by Mike Rother

- Front cover
- Author: Mike Rother
- Language: English
- Subject: Management
- Publisher: McGraw-Hill
- Publication date: August 4, 2009
- Publication place: United States
- Media type: Hardcover & eBook
- Pages: 306
- ISBN: 978-0-07-163523-3
- OCLC: 459790467
- Dewey Decimal: 658.3/01 22
- LC Class: HD62.15 .R685 2010

Toyota Kata is a management book by Mike Rother. The book explains the Improvement Kata and Coaching Kata, which are a means for making the continual improvement process as observed at the Toyota Production System teachable.

== Overview ==
Toyota Kata defines management as, “the systematic pursuit of desired conditions by utilizing human capabilities in a concerted way.” Rother proposes that it is not solutions themselves that provide sustained competitive advantage and long-term survival, but the degree to which an organization has mastered an effective routine for developing fitting solutions again and again, along unpredictable paths. This requires teaching the skills behind the solution.

In this management approach a primary job of leaders and managers is to develop people so that desired results can be achieved. They do this by having the organization members (leaders and managers included) deliberately practice a routine, or kata, that develops and channels their creative abilities. Kata are patterns that are practiced so they become second nature, and were originally movement sequences in martial arts.

Two major components of a kata are a Coaching Kata and an Improvement Kata. The Coaching Kata helps to develop skill in supporting learners — as the learner practices an Improvement Kata. Without coaching, a learner may not practice correctly or ineffectively, and a change is less likely. But because coaching itself is a skill that requires practice, the Coaching Kata helps to develop the skills to support a learner practicing an Improvement Kata. In other word, the Coaching Kata is practiced by managers, supervisors and team leaders who want to coach their learners in a scientific way of thinking and acting.

== The Improvement Kata ==
The Improvement Kata is a routine for moving from the current situation to a new situation in a creative, directed, meaningful way. It is based on a four-part model:

1. In consideration of a vision or direction...
2. Grasp the current condition.
3. Define the next target condition.
4. Move toward that target condition iteratively, which uncovers obstacles that need to be worked on.

In contrast to approaches that attempt to predict the path and focus on implementation, the Improvement Kata builds on discovery that occurs along the way. Teams using the Improvement Kata learn as they strive to reach a target condition, and adapt based on what they are learning.

Toyota Kata submits that the Improvement Kata pattern of thinking and behavior is universal; applicable not only in business but in education, politics, daily living, etc.. The book's underlying message is that when people practice and learn a kata for how to proceed through unclear territory, they don't need to fear the obstacles, changes and unknowns they encounter. Rather than trying to hold on to a sense of certainty based on one's perspective, people can derive confidence from a kata for working through uncertainty.

The notion of Improvement Kata as a process of continuous improvement contributed also to the formation of the DevOps movement.

== The Coaching Kata ==
The Coaching Kata is a routine used to teach the improvement kata and requires prior experience with practicing the Improvement Kata. The teaching approach embodied in the improvement kata within the Toyota model emphasizes a continuous, respectful mentor-mentee relationship. This method is centered around several key principles:

1. Ongoing Coaching Necessity
2. Foundation of Respect and TrustUniversal Coaching System
3. High Skill Standards for Coaches
4. Importance of A3 Thinking
5. Role of the Coach
6. Self-Directed Solution Finding
7. Accountability of Results

This method showcases a patient, respectful, and immersive learning culture where continuous improvement is not just a goal but a journey of collaborative growth and shared responsibility.
