= Aka (Burmese martial art) =

Aka are pre-arranged sets of movement or forms in Burmese martial arts. They serve as a straightforward way of passing down all of a style's techniques unto the student. They can be practiced as a form of physical conditioning, to develop muscle memory, or demonstrated as part of a public performance.

== Aka in Hanthawaddy Bando ==
The Hanthawaddy style contains nine basic forms and nine animal forms, as well as several weapon forms.

=== Basic forms ===
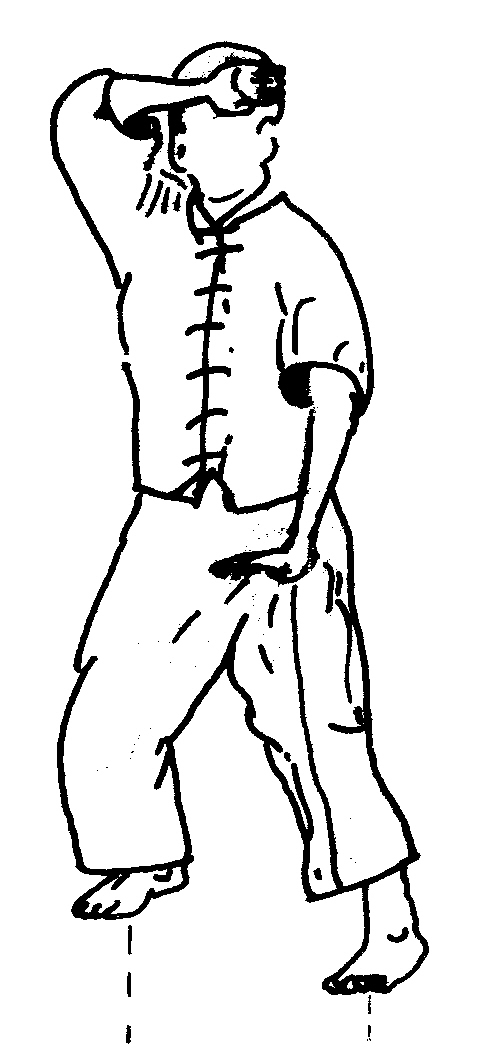
Tiger form

1. Point form (Protecting the territory)
2. Square form (Defensive stepping)
3. Cross form (Balance and movement)
4. T-form (Counter-attack)
5. Triangle form (Deceptive defense)
6. Circle form (Evasive defense)
7. Points star form (Salutation to nature/night)
8. Sun form (Salutation to the sun)
9. Line form (Salutation to warrior monks)

=== Animal forms ===
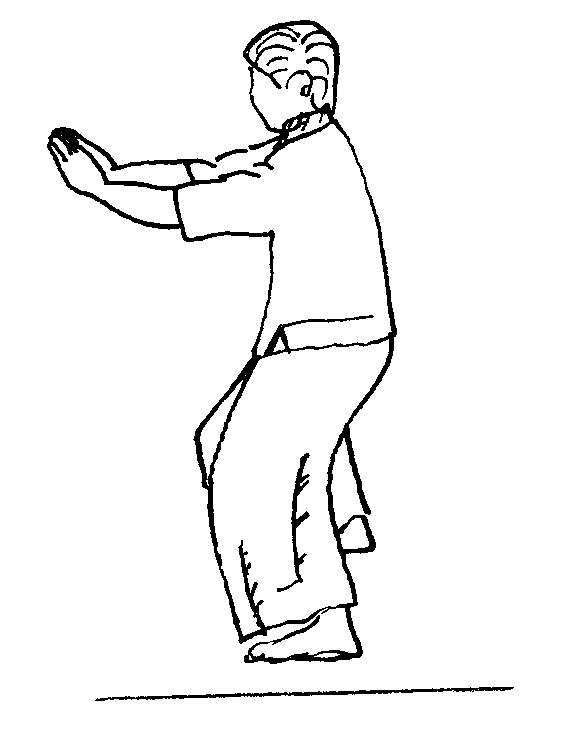
Eagle form

- Boar
- Bull
- Cobra: The cobra form emphasizes lightning quick strikes similar to the strikes of a cobra.
- Eagle: The eagle form resembles an eagle in flight by using varying angles and types of attack.
- Panther
- Python
- Scorpion
- Tiger
- Viper

=== Weapon forms ===
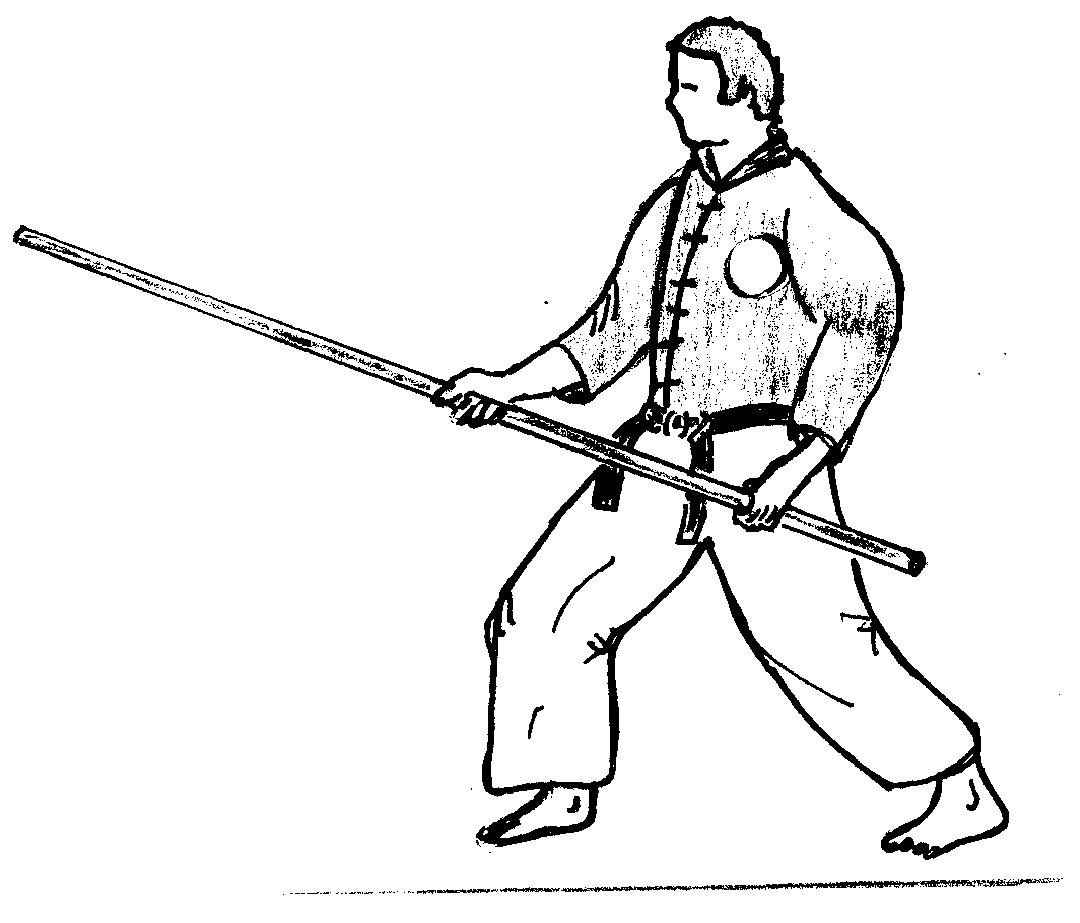
Four Winds stick form

- Long stick: Four Winds, Four Corners, Horseman, Pilgrim staff
- Medium stick and short stick
- Staff: Mandalay staff, Min dha, Monk dha
- Animal staff: Cobra, Tiger, Boar, Eagle

== See also ==
- Burmese martial arts
- Bando
- Banshay

=== See also ===
- Kata
