= Marvin Lieberman =

Economic academic

Marvin B. Lieberman
- Occupations: Management scholar, economist, and academic

Academic background
- Education: A.B., Economics; Ph.D., Business Economics
- Alma mater: Harvard University

Academic work
- Institutions: University of California, Los Angeles
- Website: marvinlieberman.com

Marvin B. Lieberman is a management scholar, economist, and academic. He is the Harry and Elsa Kunin Chair in Business and Society in the Anderson School of Management at the University of California, Los Angeles.

Lieberman's research has explored topics in economics and strategic management, primarily focusing on market entry and exit, resource deployment, economic value creation and distribution, learning curves, strategic deterrence, vertical integration, and first-mover advantages. He is a recipient of the 1989 Shigeo Shingo Prize for Manufacturing Excellence and is a fellow of the Strategic Management Society.

== Education ==
Lieberman completed his Bachelor's of Economics in 1976 and Ph.D. in Business Economics in 1982 at Harvard University.

== Career ==
Lieberman began his career in 1979 as a teaching fellow of Introductory Economics at Harvard University. From 1982 to 1989, he was an assistant professor at Stanford University. Between 1990 and 2001, he was an associate professor at the University of California, Los Angeles (UCLA), and was subsequently promoted to the rank of professor in 2001. Since 2018, he has been the Harry and Elsa Kunin Chair in Business and Society.

== Research ==
Lieberman's research has focused on business strategy, market entry, productivity, and firm performance. His early work used data on the chemical industry to examine the competitive implications of the experience curve, showing that prices tend to decline with cumulative output. In related studies, he found limited evidence that firms systematically build excess capacity to deter entry in growing industries; and he examined firm responses to industry decline, including decisions to reduce capacity or exit markets entirely. Other work addressed first-mover advantages and disadvantages, business imitation, and vertical integration, relating it to factors such as asset specificity and input variability.

With collaborators, Lieberman has shown that firms are more likely to enter new markets when they possess pre-entry resources and capabilities aligned with market requirements. He has examined how firms use acquisitions to enter new markets, and he has identified alternative organizational responses to crises, including retrenchment, persistence, innovation, and exit. His later work focuses on quantifying firm-level value creation and its distribution among stakeholders.

== Awards and honors ==
- 1979 – Broder Thompson Best Paper Award, Institute of Electrical and Electronics Engineers (IEEE)
- 1989 – Shigeo Shingo Prize for Manufacturing Excellence, Utah State University
- 1996 – Best Paper Prize, Strategic Management Journal
- Fellow, Strategic Management Society

== Selected articles ==
- Lieberman, Marvin B.; Montgomery, David B. (1988). "First-mover advantages". Strategic Management Journal. 9 (S1): 41–58. doi:10.1002/smj.4250090706.
- Lieberman, Marvin B.; Montgomery, David B. (1998). "First-mover (dis)advantages: retrospective and link with the resource-based view". Strategic Management Journal. 19 (12): 1111–1125. doi:10.1002/(SICI)1097-0266(1998120)19:12<1111::AID-SMJ21>3.0.CO;2-W.
- Helfat, C. E.; Lieberman, Marvin B. (2002). "The birth of capabilities: market entry and the importance of pre-history". Industrial and Corporate Change. 11 (4): 725–760. doi:10.1093/icc/11.4.725.
- Lieberman, Marvin B.; Asaba, Shigeru (April 2006). "Why Do Firms Imitate Each Other?". Academy of Management Review. 31 (2): 366–385. doi:10.5465/amr.2006.20208686.
- Wenzel, Matthias; Stanske, Sarah; Lieberman, Marvin B. (February 2021). "Strategic responses to crisis". Strategic Management Journal. 42 (2). doi:10.1002/smj.3161.
- Adner, Ron; Lieberman, Marvin (March 2021). "Disruption Through Complements". Strategy Science. 6 (1): 91–109. doi:10.1287/stsc.2021.0125.
