= Mike Rother =

American business academic

Mike Rother (born 1958, Michigan, USA) is an American researcher. He introduced the widespread business practices of Value Stream Mapping and Toyota Kata (Improvement Kata + Coaching Kata). He has been affiliated with the Industrial Technology Institute (Ann Arbor), the University of Michigan College of Engineering, the Fraunhofer Institute for Manufacturing Engineering and Automation (Stuttgart), and the Technical University Dortmund.

== Publications ==
- Learning to See: Value Stream Mapping to Add Value and Eliminate MUDA (1999)
- Creating Continuous Flow: An Action Guide for Managers, Engineers and Production Associates (2001)
- Toyota Kata: Managing People for Improvement, Adaptiveness and Superior Results (2009)
- The Toyota Kata Practice Guide: Practicing Scientific Thinking Skills for Superior Results in 20 Minutes a Day (2017)
- Toyota Kata Culture: Building Organizational Capability and Mindset through Kata Coaching (2017)

== Awards ==
- Shingo Prize for Excellence in Manufacturing Research: Research and Professional Publication Award, 1999, 2003 and 2011
- Association for Manufacturing Excellence Hall of Fame, 2013
