= Shingo Prize =

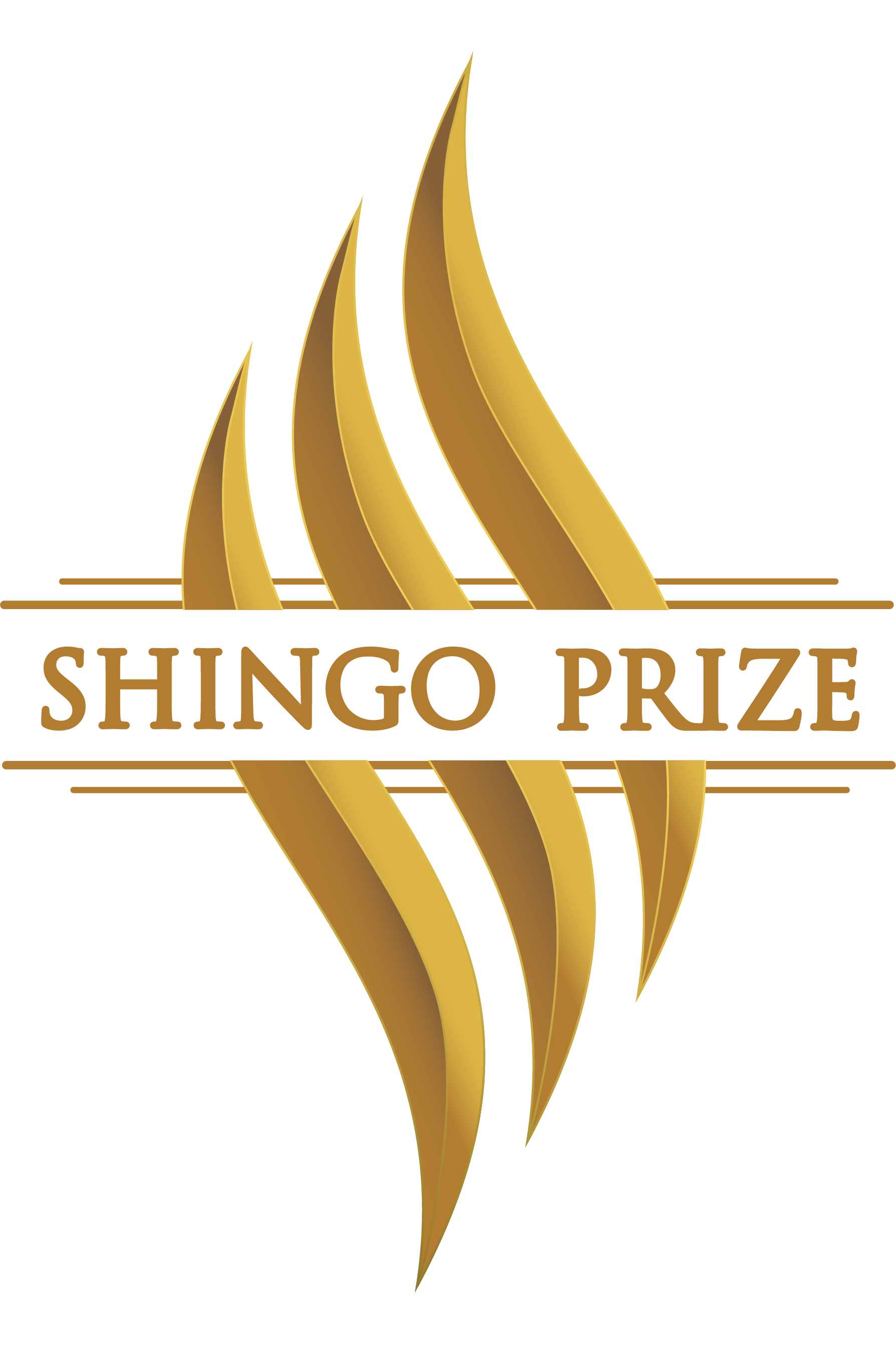
- Description: World-class organizational culture based on principles
- Presented by: The Shingo Institute at Utah State University
- First award: 1988
- Website: shingo.org

The Shingo Prize for Organizational Excellence is an award for organizational excellence given to organizations worldwide by the Shingo Institute, part of the Jon M. Huntsman School of Business at Utah State University in Logan, Utah. In order to be selected as a recipient of the Shingo Prize, an organization "challenges" or applies for the award by first submitting an achievement report that provides data about recent business improvements and accomplishments and then undergoing an onsite audit performed by Shingo Institute examiners. Organizations are scored relative to how closely their culture matches the ideal as defined by the Shingo Model. Organizations that meet the criteria are awarded the Shingo Prize. Other awards include the Shingo Silver Medallion, the Shingo Bronze Medallion, the Research Award, and the Publication Award.

== History of the Shingo Prize ==
=== Beginnings: 1988–2000 ===
In 1988, Utah State University conferred an honorary doctorate to Shigeo Shingo, a Japanese industrial engineer and author credited for his contribution to many of the principles, elements, theories, and tools associated with the Toyota Production System. That same year, Utah State University established what was then called the North American Shingo Prizes for Excellence in Manufacturing in his honor.

The Shingo Prize for Excellence in Manufacturing was first only awarded to organizations within the United States. By 1994, however, Ford Electronics in Markham, Ontario, became the first Canadian organization to receive the award. By 1997, the award was given to the first Mexican organization, Industrias CYDSA Bayer.

In 2000, BusinessWeek referred to the Shingo Prize as the "Nobel Prize of manufacturing."

=== Evolution of the Prize: 2004–2008 ===
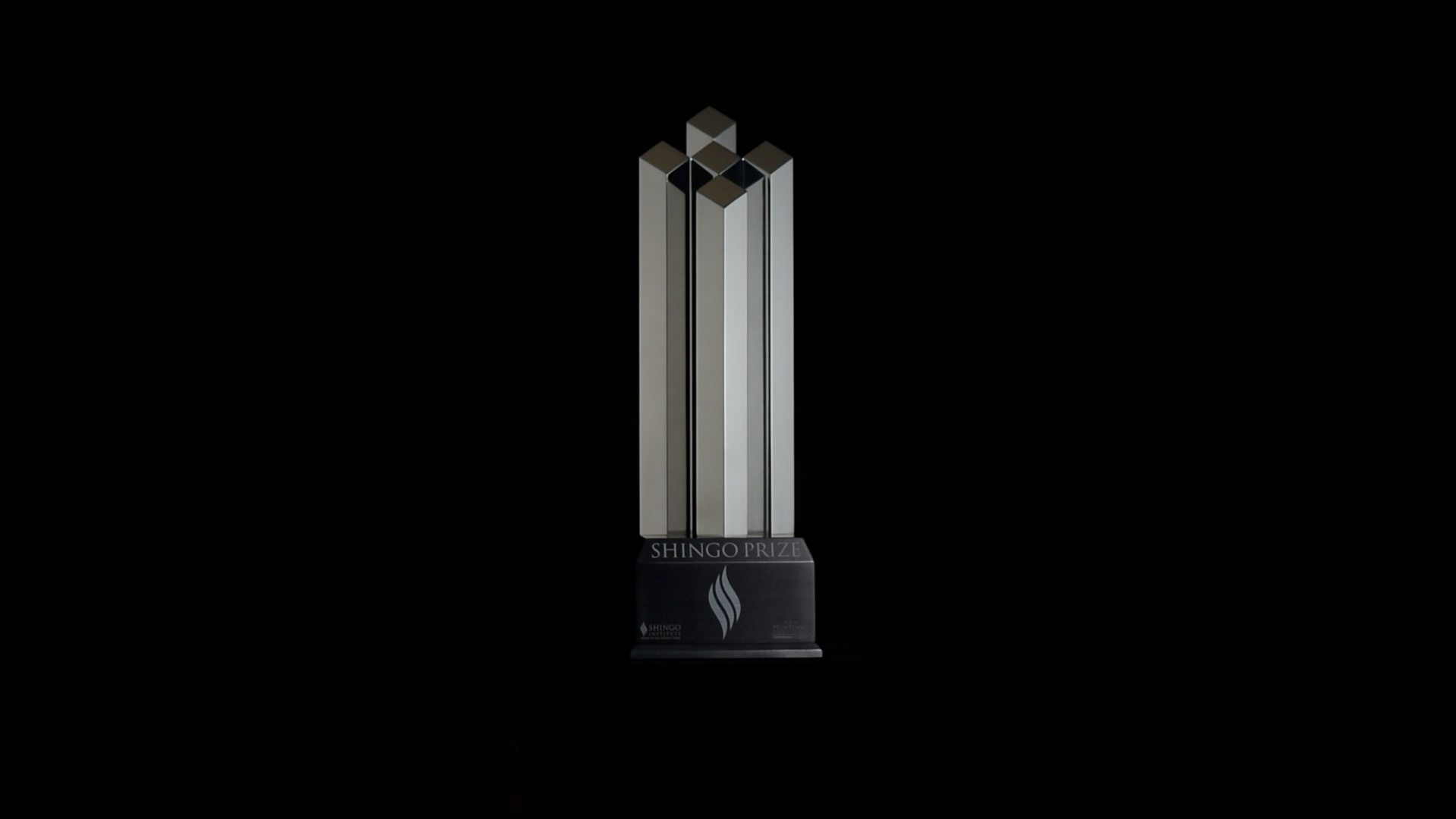
The Shingo Prize trophy

In 2004, a "Finalist" category was added to recognize challengers that scored well but didn't meet the Shingo Prize level.

In 2005, a separate awards system was established for public sector organizations. Three levels existed in the public sector awards category: Gold, Silver and Bronze.

In 2008, Utah State University changed the name of the award to the Shingo Prize for Operational Excellence in order to reflect altered criteria that made the award available to organizations from all industries, not exclusively manufacturing. The focus of the award was also shifted away from recognizing only the use of lean manufacturing tools to recognizing the overall organizational culture. This was in response to growing concern about the validity of what the Shingo Prize was supposed to signify about its recipients.

According to Robert Miller, former executive director of the Shingo Institute, "...we began to see small signs of fracture along the edges. Critics of our selection process began to emerge in blogs and websites and eventually began to confront us directly. They told us they were beginning to lose confidence in recommending, carte blanche, our recipients as benchmarking sites for their members. Over time a great many recipients had not only not moved forward but in fact had lost considerable ground and were no longer considered as role models... Without realizing it, we were evaluating the effective use of tools, the numbers and impact of events, the effectiveness of a lean program, the commitment to have full-time lean coaches, the personality of a change leader – but not deep cultural transformation of the thinking and natural behavior of leaders, managers, and associates."

That same year, the Shingo Model was released to demonstrate the role of principles within organizational culture. Shingo examiners began assessing organizational culture more on the degree to which it reflected the Shingo Guiding Principles than on the use of lean manufacturing techniques or tools.

=== The Shingo Prize Today: 2008–present ===
With a change in scoring criteria in 2008, the average number of organizations receiving the Shingo Prize each year decreased from 11 to 2.

However, Utah State University also established the Shingo Silver and Shingo Bronze Medallion award levels for challengers that scored well but did not meet the Shingo Prize standard. Gold, Silver and Bronze levels had previously been awarded to public sector organizations only, but the public sector awards program ended that year. Since then, public sector organizations have been evaluated to the same criteria as private sector organizations.

In 2009, Ultraframe in Clitheroe, Lancashire, UK, became the first European organization to receive a Shingo award, the Shingo Bronze Medallion. International interest has grown from that time such that in 2014, nine of the 11 Shingo awards were claimed by organizations outside of the United States.

In 2011, Denver Health, Community Health Services received the Shingo Bronze Medallion, becoming the first healthcare organization to receive a Shingo award. In 2012, State Farm Insurance Operations Center in Bloomington, Illinois, also received the Shingo Bronze Medallion, becoming the first financial organization to receive an award. In 2022 Codelco Radomiro Tomic-Dry Area in Chile was the first mine to receive a Shingo Prize.

In 2020, the name and logo were updated to the Shingo Prize, shifting the focus from operations to organizational excellence.

== Awards ==
=== Shingo Prize ===
According to the Shingo Institute, the Shingo Prize "is the world’s highest standard for organizational excellence" and "a worldwide recognized symbol of an organization's successful establishment of a culture anchored on principles of organizational excellence." These principles are found as part of the Shingo Model.

=== Shingo Silver ===
The Shingo Silver is awarded to "those [organizations that are] maturing on the journey [to excellence] with primarily a tool and system focus."

=== Shingo Bronze ===
The Shingo Bronze is awarded to "those [organizations] in the earlier stages of cultural transformation with primarily a tools focus."

=== Shingo Research Award ===
The Shingo Research Award is for research (in English) that makes a significant contribution to the extension of understanding and knowledge of the philosophy, principles, or methods of enterprise excellence consistent with the Shingo Model. This can either be conceptual or based on empirical research activity. There is not a self-nomination process for this award. The Shingo Research Advisory Committee decides independently which work should receive the award. Each year, up to two awards are presented at the Shingo Annual Conference in May and recognized on the Shingo Institute website.

In 2022, the Shingo Research Award was redesigned to focus exclusively on academic research."

=== Shingo Rising Star ===
The Shingo Rising Star award is a recognition category for organizational excellence professionals who are early in their careers but have already made significant contributions to the Lean community. They show their dedication to Lean principles as they significantly impact their organizations in a variety of ways. These recipients also advocate the Shingo Model and the mission of the Shingo Institute."

== Shingo Institute ==
The Shingo Prize is administered by the Shingo Institute, a program in the Jon M. Huntsman School of Business at Utah State University. Aside from administering the Shingo Prize, the Shingo Institute additionally creates and licenses educational workshops, organizes study tours, delivers a AACSB accredited online MBA program with a specialization in organizational excellence, hosts monthly webinars, produces the Shingo Principle Podcast, and organizes annual conferences in the USA, Latin America, Asia Pacific, and Europe.

== Recipients ==
=== Site Awards ===
==== 2008–Present ====
The following are the recipients of Shingo awards from the time the criteria changed in 2008 to include any industry and to reflect a higher standard of excellence.

Year	Award	Organization	City	State/Province	Country
2025	Silver	Jabil Tijuana Plant 2	Tijuana		Mexico
2025	Silver	Vale SA, Wheel Exchange and Maintenance Complex	São Luis		Brazil
2025	Shingo Prize	Abbott Rapid and Molecular Diagnostics	Hangzhou	Zhejiang	China
2024	Shingo Prize	Baxter, Hillrom SAS, Pluvigner	Pluvigner	Brittany	France
2024	Bronze	Zimmer Switzerland Manufacturing GmbH	Winterthur	Zurich	Switzerland
2024	Shingo Prize	Ipsen Manufacturing Ireland Ltd.	Dublin		Ireland
2024	Bronze	Plamex, S.A. de C.V.	Tijuana	Baja California	Mexico
2024	Silver	Jabil Baja Plant 3	Tijuana	Baja California	Mexico
2023	Shingo Prize	Jabil Circuit Shanghai Ltd.	Shanghai		China
2023	Bronze	Minsur	Pisco	Ica	Peru
2023	Shingo Prize	Abbott Logistics Breda	Breda	North-Brabant	Netherlands
2023	Bronze	Moog Medical Devices SRL	Coyol	Alajuela	Costa Rica
2023	Shingo Prize	BHP Escondida Cathodes	Antofagasta		Chile
2022	Shingo Prize	Codelco Radomiro Tomic-Dry Area	Calama	Antofagasta	Chile
2022	Silver	ICU Medical	La Aurora	Heredia	Costa Rica
2022	Shingo Prize	Abbott Nutrition Supply Chain One India	Mumbai	Jhagadia	India
2022	Silver	Boston Scientific Arden Hills	Arden Hills	MN	USA
2022	Silver	Abbott Diabetes Care	Donegal		Ireland
2022	Shingo Prize	Hologic	Coyol	Alajuela	Costa Rica
2021	Shingo Prize	Jabil Healthcare	Bray	Dublin	Ireland
2020	Shingo Prize	Ipsen Pharma Biotech	Signes		France
2020	Shingo Prize	Abbott Nutrition Supply Chain, One China Enterprise	Shanghai	Jiaxing	China
2020	Silver	Boston Scientific Clonmel	Clonmel		Ireland
2020	Silver	Edwards Service Technology Center	Jhunan		Taiwan
2020	Bronze	Edwards Service Technology Center	Cheonan		Korea
2019	Bronze	Abbott Healthcare Products B.V.	Weesp		The Netherlands
2019	Silver	Analog Devices International	Limerick		Ireland
2019	Bronze	DSV Panalpina Sorocaba	Sorocaba	Sao Paulo	Brazil
2019	Shingo Prize	Abbott Nutrition Supply Chain	Sturgis	Michigan	USA
2019	Shingo Prize	Boston Scientific Coyol	Coyol	Alajuela	Costa Rica
2019	Shingo Prize	Merit Medical Systems Inc.	Tijuana	Baja California	Mexico
2019	Shingo Prize	Regeneron Pharmaceuticals Inc - Industrial Operations & Product Supply	Rensselaer	NY	USA
2019	Shingo Prize	Abbott Nutrition Supply Chain, Singapore	Singapore	Singapore	Singapore
2019	Silver	Hologic Surgical Products	Coyol	Alajuela	Costa Rica
2019	Silver	Visteon Electronics India Private Limited	Chengalpattu	Tamil Nado	India
2018	Shingo Prize	Abbott Nutrition Supply Chain Granada	Granada	Granada	Spain
2018	Shingo Prize	AbbVie Ballytivnan	Sligo	Connacht	Ireland
2018	Shingo Prize	Ball Beverage Packaging Naro-Fominsk Cans	Novaya Olkhovka	Moscow	Russia
2017	Shingo Prize	Abbott Nutrition Supply Chain Sligo Ireland	Sligo	Connacht	Ireland
2017	Shingo Prize	Thermo Fisher Scientific Baltics	Vilnius	Vilnius	Lithuania
2017	Shingo Prize	Ball Beverage Packaging Europe, Naro Fominsk Ends	Novaya Olkhovka	Moscow	Russia
2017	Bronze	Landau Scrubs and Uniforms Medical & Nursery	Puerto Cortes	Cortes	Honduras
2016	Shingo Prize	Boston Scientific, Cork	Cork	Munster	Ireland
2014	Shingo Prize	NewsUk - Newsprinters Ltd	Holytown	Motherwell	UK
2014	Shingo Prize	Barnes Aerospace OEM Strategic Business	Ogden	Utah	USA
2014	Shingo Prize	DePuy Synthes Ireland	Cork		Ireland
2014	Shingo Prize	Abbott Vascular	Clonmel	Tipperary	Ireland
2014	Silver	Rexam Healthcare, Neuenburg	Neuenburg am Rhein		Germany
2014	Silver	Rexam Beverage Can, Enzesfeld	Enzesfeld	Vienna	Austria
2014	Silver	Boston Scientific, Maple Grove	Maple Grove	Minnesota	USA
2014	Silver	Vale Europe Ltd., Clydach Refinery	Clydach	Swansea	UK
2014	Bronze	Vistaprint Deer Park Australia	Derrimut	Victoria	Australia
2014	Bronze	Corporation Steris Canada	Quebec	QC	Canada
2014	Bronze	Autoliv (China) Inflator Co., Ltd.	Shanghai		China
2014	Bronze	Rexam Beverage Can South America, Rio de Janeiro	Rio de Janeiro	RJ	Brazil
2013	Silver	MEI Querétaro	El Marques	Querétaro	Mexico
2013	Silver	Pentair Water Pool and Spa	Moorpark	California	USA
2013	Silver	Rexam Beverage Can South America, Manaus Ends	Manaus	Amazons	Brazil
2013	Silver	Rexam do Brasil Ltda Extrema Can Plant	Extrema	Minas Gerais	Brazil
2013	Silver	Visteon Climate Systems India Ltd.	Bhiwadi	Rajasthan	India
2013	Silver	Visteon Electronica Mexico - Saucito Plant	Chihuahua	Chihuahua	Mexico
2013	Bronze	Covidien	Athlone		Ireland
2013	Bronze	Letterkenny Army Depot, Force Provider	Chambersburg	Pennsylvania	USA
2013	Bronze	Regeneron Pharmaceuticals Inc. (IOPS)	Rensselaer	New York	USA
2013	Bronze	Rexam Beverage Can South America, Cuiabá Cans	Cuiabá	Mato Grosso	Brazil
2013	Bronze	Starkey de Mexico S.A. de C.V.	Matamoros	Tamaulipas	Mexico
2012	Shingo Prize	Ethicon Inc.	Juarez	Chihuahua	Mexico
2012	Shingo Prize	Rexam Beverage Can, Águas Claras Cans	Águas Claras	Rio Grande do Sul	Brazil
2012	Silver	Pentair Technical Products	Reynosa	Tamaulipas	Mexico
2012	Silver	Tobyhanna Army Depot, COMSEC	Tobyhanna	Pennsylvania	USA
2012	Silver	Vision Electronica Mexico - Carolinas Plant	Chihuahua	Chihuahua	Mexico
2012	Bronze	Johnson Controls Lerma Plant	Lerma		Mexico
2012	Bronze	Lake Region Medical Limited	New Ross	Co. Wexford	Ireland
2012	Bronze	Remy Automotive Brasil Ltda.	Brusque	Santa Catarina	Brazil
2012	Bronze	State Farm Life Insurance Company, Operations Center	Bloomington	Illinois	USA
2011	Shingo Prize	Goodyear do Brasil Produtos de Borracha Ltda	São Paulo	São Paulo	Brazil
2011	Shingo Prize	US Synthetic	Orem	Utah	USA
2011	Silver	Autoliv (China) Steering Wheel Co., Ltd.	Shanghai		China
2011	Silver	Barnes Aerospace OEM Strategic Business	Ogden	Utah	USA
2011	Silver	dj Orthopedics de Mexico S.A. de C.V.	Tijuana	Baja California	Mexico
2011	Silver	Lundbeck, Supply Operation & Engineering (Valby and Lumsas site)	Valby	Copenhagen	Denmark
2011	Silver	Remy Componentes, S. de R.L. de C.V.	San Luis Potosí	SLP	Mexico
2011	Silver	Rexam Beverage Can South America-Recife Ends	Cabo Sto Agostinho	Cabo Sto Agostinho	Brazil
2011	Silver	Tobyhanna Army Depot (AN/MST-T1(V))	Tobyhanna	Pennsylvania	USA
2011	Bronze	Denver Health, Community Health Services	Denver	Colorado	USA
2011	Bronze	Letterkenny Army Depot, Aviation Ground Power Unit	Chambersburg	Pennsylvania	USA
2011	Bronze	Leyland Trucks Ltd.	Leyland	Lancashire	UK
2011	Bronze	Rexam Plastic Packaging do Brasil	Jundiaí	São Paulo	Brazil
2011	Bronze	US Army Armament Research, Development & Engineering Center	Picatinny Arsenal	New Jersey	USA
2010	Shingo Prize	John Deere, Power Products	Greenville	Tennessee	USA
2010	Shingo Prize	Lycoming Engines	Williamsport	Pennsylvania	USA
2010	Silver	Autoliv Steering Wheels Mexico AQW S. de R.L. de C.V.	El Marqués		Mexico
2010	Silver	Goodyear Tire & Rubber	Lawton	Oklahoma	USA
2010	Silver	High-Tech Gears Ltd.	Minesar		India
2010	Bronze	Letterkenny Army Depot, Patriot Missile	Chambersburg	Pennsylvania	USA
2010	Bronze	Tobyhanna Army Depot, AIM-9M Sidewinder Missile	Tobyhanna	Pennsylvania	USA
2009	Shingo Prize	Autoliv Airbag Module Facility	Ogden	Utah	USA
2009	Shingo Prize	E-Z-GO	Augusta	Georgia	USA
2009	Shingo Prize	Guanajuato Manufacturing Complex North Plant	Silao		Mexico
2009	Shingo Prize	Interiors Aéreos S.A. de C.V. Gulfstream Aerospace	Mexicali		Mexico
2009	Silver	402D Electronics Maintenance Group, Warner Robins Air Logistics Center, Robins Air Force Base	Warner Robins	Georgia	USA
2009	Silver	Carestream Health Inc., Rochester Finishing	Rochester	New York	USA
2009	Silver	EFI Electronics by Schneider Electric	Salt Lake City	Utah	USA
2009	Silver	HID Global	North Haven	Connecticut	USA
2009	Silver	Lockheed Martin Missiles and Fire Control, Camden Operations	East Camden	Arkansas	USA
2009	Silver	Valeo Sulvania Illuminacion	Querétaro		Mexico
2009	Bronze	Aviation Center Logistics Command and Army Fleet Support, Lowe Army Heliport	Fort Rucker	Alabama	USA
2009	Bronze	BAE Systems - Samlesbury	Blackburn	Lancashire	UK
2009	Bronze	Baxter Healthcare	Los Angeles	California	USA
2009	Bronze	Fleet Readiness Center Southeast, TSRS Shop	Jacksonville	Florida	USA
2009	Bronze	Red River Army Depot, Up-Armored High Mobility Multipurpose Wheeled Vehicle (UAH)/HEAT	Texarkana	Texas	USA
2009	Bronze	Ultrafram UK Ltd.	Clitheroe	Lancashire	UK
2009	Bronze	Visteon Interamerican Plant	Apodaca		Mexico

==== 1989-2007 ====
The following are the recipients of Shingo awards from the establishment of the Shingo Prize for Excellence in Manufacturing until the criteria and name changed to the Shingo Prize for Operational Excellence in 2008.

Year	Award	Organization	City	State/Province	Country
2007	Bronze	Anniston Army Depot, Turbine Value Stream	Anniston	AL	USA
2007	Silver	Anniston Army Depot, Vehicle Value Stream, Tracked Systems Division	Anniston	AL	USA
2007	Shingo Prize	Autoliv Querétaro CMX Facility	Querétaro		Mexico
2007	Bronze	Aviation Center Logistics Command and Army Fleet Support, TH-67 C20J Engine Project	Ft. Rucker	AL	USA
2007	Finalist	BAE Systems Ground Division	York	PA	USA
2007	Shingo Prize	Baxter Healthcare, North Cove Plant	Marion	NC	USA
2007	Shingo Prize	Baxter S.A. de C.V., Cuernavaca, Mexico Plant	Jiutepec Morelos		Mexico
2007	Finalist	Boeing, KC 135 GATM	San Antonio	TX	USA
2007	Shingo Prize	Cordis de Mexico	Chihuahua		Mexico
2007	Bronze	Corpus Christi Army Depot (CCAD), H-60 Pavehawk Joint Depot Level Maintenance (JDLM) Program	Corpus Christi	TX	USA
2007	Shingo Prize	Delphi Packard Electrical/Electronic Architecture's Cableados Fresnillo 1	Fresnillo		Mexico
2007	Shingo Prize	Delphi Packard Electrical/Electronic Architecture's Chihuahua 1	Chihuahua		Mexico
2007	Shingo Prize	DENSO Manufacturing Tennessee, Inc., Instrument Cluster Division	Maryville	TN	USA
2007	Gold	Fleet Readiness Center (FRC) East, H-1 Helicopter Line, MCAS	Cherry Point	NC	USA
2007	Bronze	Fleet Readiness Center Southeast (FRCSE), EA-6B Value Stream	Jacksonville	FL	USA
2007	Shingo Prize	Hearth & Home Technologies	Mount Pleasant	IA	USA
2007	Silver	Hill Air Force Base, 574th Aircraft Structural Repair Squadron	Ogden	UT	USA
2007	Bronze	Letterkenny Army Depot (LEAD), Power Generation Equipment	Chambersburg	PA	USA
2007	Silver	Letterkenny Army Depot, Tactical Wheeled Vehicles, HMMWV	Chambersburg	PA	USA
2007	Silver	Naval Sea System Command, Port Hueneme Division (PHD), RAM Value Stream	Port Hueneme	CA	USA
2007	Shingo Prize	Raytheon Missile Systems	Louisville	KY	USA
2007	Silver	Red River Army Depot (RRAD), Bradley Fighting Vehicle System (BFVS) Power Train Processes	Texarkana	TX	USA
2007	Silver	Red River Army Depot, Heavy Expanded Mobility Tactical Truck (HEMTT) Center of Industrial and Technical Excellence	Texarkana	TX	USA
2007	Gold	Red River Army Depot, High Mobility Multipurpose Wheeled Vehicle (HMMWV) Center of Industrial and Technical Excellence	Texarkana	TX	USA
2007	Bronze	Robins Air Force Base, 572nd Commodities Maintenance Squadron, F-15 Wing Flight	Warner Robins	GA	USA
2007	Gold	Rock Island Arsenal, Joint Manufacturing and Technology Center, Forward Repair System (FRS) Value Stream	Rock Island	IL	USA
2007	Silver	Rock Island Arsenal, Joint Manufacturing and Technology Center, Shop Equipment Contact Maintenance (SECM) System Value Stream	Rock Island	IL	USA
2007	Shingo Prize	Solectron Manufactura de Mexico	Guadalajara		Mexico
2007	Shingo Prize	Takata Seat Weight Sensor, Equipo Automotriz Americana	Monterrey		Mexico
2007	Shingo Prize	The HON Company, LA South Gate Plant	South Gate	CA	USA
2007	Gold	Tobyhanna Army Depot, Antenna Transceiver Group	Tobyhanna	PA	USA
2007	Finalist	ZF Lemforder Corporation	Tuscaloosa	AL	USA
2006	Bronze	568th Fighter Avionics Squadron, 402d Maintenance Wing, Warner Robins Air Logistics Center, Robins Air Force Base	Warner Robins	GA	USA
2006	Shingo Prize	Aspect Medical Systems	Newton	MA	USA
2006	Shingo Prize	Autoliv, Inc	Promontory	UT	USA
2006	Shingo Prize	Delphi Corporation, Delco Electronics, Plant 58	Chihuahua		Mexico
2006	Shingo Prize	Delphi Corporation, Milwaukee Operations	Oak Creek	WI	USA
2006	Shingo Prize	Delphi Corporation, Plant 65	Querétaro		Mexico
2006	Shingo Prize	Delphi Corporation, Plant 66	Querétaro		Mexico
2006	Shingo Prize	dj Orthopedics	Vista	CA	USA
2006	Bronze	Robins Air Force Base, F-15 Programmed Depot Maintenance, Warner Robins Air Logistics Center	Warner Robins	GA	USA
2006	Gold	Hill Air Force Base, F-16 Aircraft Maintenance Squadron	Ogden	UT	USA
2006	Finalist	Freudenberg-NOK, Components Plant	Bristol	NH	USA
2006	Silver	Red River Army Depot, HMMWV Recap	Texarkana	TX	USA
2006	Finalist	John Deere, Power Products	Greeneville	TN	USA
2006	Gold	Rock Island Arsenal, Joint Manufacturing and Technology Center, Forward Repair System (FRS) Value Stream	Rock Island	IL	USA
2006	Shingo Prize	Methode Mexico, S.A. de C.V	Apodaca		Mexico
2006	Bronze	Responsive Neutron Generator Product Deployment Center, Sandia National Laboratories	Albuquerque	NM	USA
2006	Gold	Robins Air Force Base, C-5 Programmed Depot Maintenance	Warner Robins	GA	USA
2006	Finalist	Rockwell Collins, Coralville Operations	Coralville	IA	USA
2006	Finalist	Scotsman Ice Systems, Fairfax Operation	Fairfax	SC	USA
2006	Shingo Prize	Steelcase, Inc.	City of Industry	CA	USA
2006	Silver	Letterkenny Army Depot, Tactical Vehicles – HMMWV Recap	Chambersburg	PA	USA
2006	Shingo Prize	TI Automotive, Mexico City Plant	Tultitlan		Mexico
2006	Bronze	Tobyhanna Army Depot, AN/TPS-75 Air Defense Radar System	Tobyhanna	PA	USA
2005	Shingo Prize	Autoliv, Inc	Tremonton	UT	USA
2005	Shingo Prize	BAE Systems, Platform Solutions	Ft. Wayne	IN	USA
2005	Shingo Prize	Boston Scientific, Maple Grove Operations	Maple Grove	MN	USA
2005	Finalist	Brazeway, Inc.	Adrian	MI	USA
2005	Shingo Prize	Celestica de Monterrey	Monterrey		Mexico
2005	Finalist	Delphi Automotive Systems Plant 32 RBE VII	Juarez		Mexico
2005	Shingo Prize	Delphi Corporation, Delphi Sistemas & Energy, Saltillo Operations Plant 39	Saltillo		Mexico
2005	Shingo Prize	Delphi Ensamble de Cables y Componentes, Guadalupe II Plant 84	Guadalupe		Mexico
2005	Shingo Prize	Delphi Packard Electric, Vienna Molding Operations	Warren	OH	USA
2005	Finalist	Delphi Sistemas de Energia Plant 59	Torreon		Mexico
2005	Shingo Prize	GDX Automotive	New Haven	MO	USA
2005	Shingo Prize	Hearth & Home Technologies	Lake City	MN	USA
2005	Silver	Hill AFB, Commodities Branch, Pylons Shop	Ogden	UT	USA
2005	Silver	Hill AFB, F-16 Branch CCIP Business Unit	Ogden	UT	USA
2005	Silver	Letterkenny Army Depot, Patriot Missile Air Defense System	Chambersburg	PA	USA
2005	Shingo Prize	Lockheed Martin Missiles	Archbald	PA	USA
2005	Finalist	Noble Metal Processing de Mexico S. de R. L. de C. V. Silao Plant	Silao		Mexico
2005	Gold	Robins AFB, C-5 Programmed Depot Maintenance	Warner Robins	GA	USA
2005	Shingo Prize	Takata Seat Belts, Inc., Automortiz Americana, S.A.de C.V., Agua Prienta Plant	Agua Prienta		Mexico
2005	Shingo Prize	Takata Seat Belts, Inc., Automortiz Americana, S.A.de C.V., Monterrey Plant 1	Apodaca		Mexico
2005	Shingo Prize	Takata Seat Belts, Inc., Automortiz Americana, S.A.de C.V., Monterrey Plant 2	Apodaca		Mexico
2005	Finalist	Takata Seatbelts, Inc. Del Rio Plant	Del Rio	TX	USA
2005	Shingo Prize	The Boeing Company, Apache Longbow Program	Mesa	AZ	USA
2005	Shingo Prize	The Boeing Company, Weapons ECC	St. Charles	MO	USA
2005	Silver	Tinker AFB, Aircraft Division, KC-135 Branch	Tinker AFB	OK	USA
2004	Shingo Prize	ArvinMeritor	Columbus	IN	USA
2004	Finalist	Aspect Medical Systems, Inc.	Newton	MA	USA
2004	Shingo Prize	Delphi Corporation, CENTEC Plant 98	Ramos Arizpe		Mexico
2004	Shingo Prize	Delphi Corporation, Delphi Sistemas & Energy, Chihuahua Operations	Chihuahua		Mexico
2004	Shingo Prize	Delphi Corporation, Electronics & Safety, Delnosa Operations, Plants 5 & 6	Reynosa		Mexico
2004	Shingo Prize	Delphi Corporation, Electronics & Safety, Kokomo Operations, Plants 7 & 9	Kokomo	IN	USA
2004	Shingo Prize	Delphi Corporation, Plant 50	Del Parral		Mexico
2004	Shingo Prize	Delphi Corporation, Plant 51	Casas Grandes		Mexico
2004	Shingo Prize	Delphi Corporation, Plant 58	Meoqui		Mexico
2004	Shingo Prize	Delphi Corporation, Tlaxcala Operations	Tlaxcala		Mexico
2004	Finalist	Delphi Lansing Cockpit Plant	Lansing	MI	USA
2004	Finalist	Delphi Saginaw Operations	Saginaw	MI	USA
2004	Finalist	Delphi Saginaw Steering Plant 7	Saginaw	MI	USA
2004	Finalist	GDX Automotive	New Haven	MO	USA
2004	Finalist	GDX Automotive, Vehicle Sealing Products	Batesville	AR	USA
2004	Shingo Prize	Maytag Jackson Dishwashing	Jackson	TN	USA
2004	Finalist	Maytag-Searcy Laundry Products	Searcy	AR	USA
2004	Finalist	Nemak Corp. of Canada Windsor Aluminum Plant	Windsor	ON	Canada
2004	Shingo Prize	Raytheon Missile Systems Mfg.	Tucson	AZ	USA
2004	Shingo Prize	TI Automotive	Cartersville	GA	USA
2004	Finalist	TI Automotive Brake Tube Assemblies	Greeneville	TN	USA
2003	Shingo Prize	Affordable Interior Systems	Hudson	MA	USA
2003	Shingo Prize	Autoliv, Airbag Module Facility	Ogden	UT	USA
2003	Shingo Prize	Autoliv, Inflator Facilities; Brigham City and Ogden, UT	Brigham City	UT	USA
2003	Shingo Prize	Delphi Corporation, Delco Electronics	Flint	MI	USA
2003	Shingo Prize	Delphi Corporation, Delco Electronics, Delnosa Operations Plant 1-4	Reynosa		Mexico
2003	Shingo Prize	Delphi Corporation, Juarez Operations	Juarez		Mexico
2003	Shingo Prize	Delphi Corporation, Packard Electric, Warren Plant 19	Warren	OH	USA
2003	Shingo Prize	Lockheed Martin Aeronautics, F-117 Plant	Palmdale	CA	USA
2003	Shingo Prize	Medtronic Xomed	Jacksonville	FL	USA
2003	Shingo Prize	Merillat Industries	Atkins	VA	USA
2003	Shingo Prize	Symbol Technologies; Holtsville, NY, McAllen, TX & Reynosa, Mexico	Holtsville	NY	USA
2003	Shingo Prize	The HON Company	Cedartown	GA	USA
2003	Shingo Prize	TI Automotive	Caro	MI	USA
2003	Shingo Prize	TI Automotive	New Haven	MI	USA
2003	Shingo Prize	Vibracoustic	Manchester	NH	USA
2002	Shingo Prize	Bridgestone/Firestone	Aiken County	SC	USA
2002	Shingo Prize	Bridgewater Interiors	Detroit	MI	USA
2002	Shingo Prize	Delphi Corporation, Adrian Operations	Adrian	MI	USA
2002	Shingo Prize	Delphi Corporation, Alambrados y Circuitos Electricos VII	Los Mochis		Mexico
2002	Shingo Prize	Delphi Corporation, Cortland Molding	Cortland	OH	USA
2002	Shingo Prize	Delphi Corporation, Delco Electronics de Mexico, Deltronicos	Matamoros		Mexico
2002	Shingo Prize	Delphi Corporation, Harrison Thermal Systems, Rio Bravo XX	Juarez		Mexico
2002	Shingo Prize	Ensign-Bickford; Graham, KY, Simsbury, CT, Spanish Fork, UT, & Wolf Lake, IL	Graham	KY	USA
2002	Shingo Prize	Ford Motor, Chicago Assembly	Chicago	IL	USA
2002	Shingo Prize	Ford Motor, Chihuahua Engine	Chihuahua		Mexico
2002	Shingo Prize	Ford Motor, Romeo Engine	Romeo	MI	USA
2002	Shingo Prize	Freudenberg-NOK	Shelbyville	IN	USA
2002	Shingo Prize	Grupo CYDSA, IQUISA; Monterrey and Tlaxcala, MX	Monterrey		Mexico
2002	Shingo Prize	Lockheed Martin, Missile and Fire Control, Pike County	Troy	AL	USA
2002	Shingo Prize	Tyco Fire and Security, Sensormatic		Puerto Rico	USA
2002	Shingo Prize	Vibration Control Technologies	Ligonier	IN	USA
2002	Shingo Prize	Woodland Furniture	Idaho Falls	ID	USA
2001	Shingo Prize	Baxter Healthcare	Mountain Home	AR	USA
2001	Shingo Prize	Benteler Automotive, Hagen Exhaust	Grand Rapids	MI	USA
2001	Shingo Prize	Ford Motor, Essex Engine	Windsor	ON	Canada
2001	Shingo Prize	Ford Motor, Ohio Assembly	Avon Lake	OH	USA
2001	Shingo Prize	Freudenberg-NOK	Cleveland	GA	USA
2001	Shingo Prize	Johnson Controls	Greenfield	OH	USA
2000	Shingo Prize	Baxter Healthcare	Marion	NC	USA
2000	Shingo Prize	Delphi Corporation, Componentes Mecanicos	Matamoros		Mexico
2000	Shingo Prize	Delphi Corporation, Steering Plant 6	Saginaw	MI	USA
2000	Shingo Prize	Ford Motor, Windsor Engine	Windsor	ON	Canada
2000	Shingo Prize	Freudenberg-NOK	LaGrange	GA	USA
2000	Shingo Prize	Grupo CYDSA, Policyd La Presa	Tlanepantla		Mexico
2000	Shingo Prize	Lockheed Martin Aeronautics	Fort Worth	TX	USA
2000	Shingo Prize	Lucent Technologies, Product Realization Center	Mt. Olive	NJ	USA
1999	Shingo Prize	Delphi Corporation, Rimir	Matamoros		Mexico
1999	Shingo Prize	Federal-Mogul	Hampton	VA	USA
1999	Shingo Prize	Grupo CYDSA, Sales del Istmo	Coatzacoalcos		Mexico
1999	Shingo Prize	O.C. Tanner	Salt Lake City	UT	USA
1999	Shingo Prize	Spicer Cardanes	Querétaro		Mexico
1999	Shingo Prize	Wiremold	West Harford	CT	USA
1998	Shingo Prize	Coach	Carlstadt	NJ	USA
1998	Shingo Prize	Freudenberg-NOK, Gasket Lead Center	Manchester	NH	USA
1998	Shingo Prize	Grupo CYDSA, IQUISA	Coatzacoalcos		Mexico
1998	Shingo Prize	Johnson Controls	Lexington	TN	USA
1998	Shingo Prize	Lear	Winchester	VA	USA
1998	Shingo Prize	Milwaukee Electric Tool	Brookfield	WI	USA
1998	Shingo Prize	Tremec Transimisiones Y Equipos Mecanicos	Querétaro		Mexico
1997	Shingo Prize	Champion International	Sartel	MN	USA
1997	Shingo Prize	Grupo CYDSA, Policyd	Altamira		Mexico
1997	Shingo Prize	Industrias CYDSA Bayer	Coatzacoalcos		Mexico
1997	Shingo Prize	Johnson Controls, ASG	Linden	TN	USA
1997	Shingo Prize	Johnson Controls, ASG	Pulaski	TN	USA
1997	Shingo Prize	Johnson Controls, ASG	Jefferson City	MO	USA
1997	Shingo Prize	Johnson Controls, ASG, Quality Drive	Georgetown	KY	USA
1997	Shingo Prize	Perfecseal – Bemis Company	Philadelphia	PA	USA
1997	Shingo Prize	TechnoTrim	Livonia	MI	USA
1996	Shingo Prize	Eaton Yale Ltd.	St. Thomas	ON	Canada
1996	Shingo Prize	Ford Motor, Cleveland Engine Plant #2	Cleveland	OH	USA
1996	Shingo Prize	Ford Motor, North Penn Electronics	Lansdale	PA	USA
1996	Shingo Prize	Harris Corporation, Farinon Division	San Antonio	TX	USA
1996	Shingo Prize	Johnson Controls, ASG	Orangeville	ON	Canada
1996	Shingo Prize	Johnson Controls, ASG, FoaMech	Georgetown	KY	USA
1996	Shingo Prize	Merix	Forest Grove	OR	USA
1995	Shingo Prize	LifeScan – Johnson & Johnson	Milpitas	CA	USA
1995	Shingo Prize	MascoTech – Braun	Detroit	MI	USA
1995	Shingo Prize	Nucor – Yamato Steel	Blytheville	AR	USA
1995	Shingo Prize	Tennalum, Kaiser Aluminum	Jackson	TN	USA
1995	Shingo Prize	The Foxboro Company, I/A Division	Foxboro	MA	USA
1995	Shingo Prize	Vintec	Murfreesboro	TN	USA
1994	Shingo Prize	Alcatel Networks Systems; Richardson, TX, Longview, TX, Raleigh, NC, Clinton, NC, & Nogales, Mexico	Richardson	TX	USA
1994	Shingo Prize	AT&T Technologies, Microelectronics	Orlando	FL	USA
1994	Shingo Prize	Ford Electronics	Markham	ON	Canada
1994	Shingo Prize	General Tire	Mt. Vernon	IL	USA
1994	Shingo Prize	Johnson & Johnson, Medical Vascular Access	Southington	CT	USA
1994	Shingo Prize	The Timken Company	Gaffney	SC	USA
1994	Shingo Prize	Union Carbide, Ethyleneamines Business; Danbury, CT, Taft, LA, & Texas City, TX	Danbury	CT	USA
1993	Shingo Prize	Gates Rubber	Siloam Springs	AR	USA
1993	Shingo Prize	Wilson Sporting Goods, Golf Balls	Humboldt	TN	USA
1992	Shingo Prize	AT&T Technologies, Microelectronics, Power Systems	Mesquite	TX	USA
1992	Shingo Prize	Iomega	Roy	UT	USA
1991	Shingo Prize	Dana Mobile Fluid Products Division	Minneapolis	MN	USA
1991	Shingo Prize	Exxon Chemical, Butyl Polymers Americas	Houston	TX	USA
1991	Shingo Prize	Glacier Vandervell	Atlantic	IA	USA
1991	Shingo Prize	Lifeline Systems	Watertown	MA	USA
1990	Shingo Prize	United Electric Controls	Watertown	MA	USA
1989	Shingo Prize	Globe Metallurgical	Beverly	OH	USA

=== The Shingo Research Award and the Shingo Publication Award ===
The following are recipients of the Shingo Research Award or the Shingo Publication Award.

Year	Author(s)	Submission Title
2025	Fabrice Bernhard and Benoît Charles-Lavauzelle	The Lean Tech Manifesto
2025	Andrea Furlan and Daryl Powell	A Research Agenda for Lean Management
2025	Chris Warner, Caroline Greenlee, and Chris Butterworth	Why Care
2025	Mark Graban	The Mistakes That Make Us
2024	Sylvain Landry	Bringing Scientific Thinking to Life
2024	Dennis R. Delisle	Lean Healthcare 2nd edition
2024	Noel Hennessey, John Bicheno	Human Lean
2023	Katie Anderson	Learning to Lead, Leading to Learn
2023	John Toussaint, Kim Barnas, Emily Adams	Becoming the Change
2023	Michael Ballé, Nicolas Chartier, Guillaume Paoli, Régis Medina	Raise the Bar
2023	Michael Martyn	Management for Omotenashi: Learning to Lead for Purpose, Passion & Performance
2023	Patrick Adams	Avoiding the Continuous Appearance Trap
2022	Chris Butterworth, Morgan L. Jones, Peter Hines	Why Bother? Why and How to Assess Your Continuous-Improvement Culture
2022	Christoph Roser	All About Pull Production
2021	Peter Willmott, John Quirke, Andy Brunskill	TPM: A Foundation of Operational Excellence
2020	Michael Ballé, Nicolas Chartier, Pascale Coignet, Sandrine Olivencia, Daryl Powell, Eivind Reke	The Lean Sensei
2020	Joe Donarumo, Keyan Zandy	The Lean Builder: A Builder's Guide to Applying Lean
2019	Collin McLoughlin, Toshihiko Miura	True Kaizen: Management's Role in Improving Work Climate and Culture
2019	Michael Martyn, Mark McKenzie, Doug Merrill	Implementing a Culture of Continuous Improvement at the University of Washington
2019	Robert Derald Miller	Hearing the Voice of the Shingo Principles
2019	Peter Hines, Chris Butterworth	The Essence of Excellence
2019	Morgan Jones, Chris Butterworth, Brenton Harder	4+1 – Embedding a Culture of Continuous Improvement (2nd Edition)
2018	V K Singh, Paul Lillrank	Innovations in Healthcare Management
2018	Arthur Byrne	The Lean Turnaround Action Guide
2018	Jacob Stoller	The Lean CEO: Leading the Way to World-Class Excellence
2017	Tracey Richardson, Ernie Richardson	The Toyota Engagement Equation
2017	Dantar Oosterwal	The Lean Machine
2017	Jim Lancaster	The Work of Management
2017	Mark Hamel, Michael O’Connor	Lean Math: Figuring to Improve
2017	Jefrey K. Liker, Karyn Ross	The Toyota Way to Service Excellence
2016	Matthias Thürer, Mark Stevenson, Charles Protzman	Card-Based Control Systems for a Lean Work Design
2016	Jan Compton, MS-HCAD, BSN, RN, CPHQ	Achieving Safe Health Care
2016	Paul Akers	2 Second Lean
2016	Bruce Hamilton	The GBMP Management Engagement DVD Series
2016	Ben Hartman	The Lean Farm
2016	John Toussaint	Management on the Mend
2016	Norbert Majerus	Lean-Driven Innovation
2016	Michael Bremer	How to Do a Gemba Walk
2016	Jeffrey K. Liker	Developing Lean Leaders
2016	William H. Baker Jr., Kenneth Rolfes	Lean for the Long Term
2016	Daniel Markovitz	Building the Fit Organization
2015	Dr. Patricia Gabow. Philip Goodman	The Lean Prescription
2015	Michael Ballé, Freddy Ballé	Lead with Respect
2015	Steve Hoeft & Robert Pryor	The Power of Ideas to Transform Healthcare
2015	John Lee	Rising Above It All
2015	Gary Conner	Lean Epiphanies
2015	Robert H. Goldsmith	Toyota's 8-Steps to Problem Solving
2015	Bruce Hamilton, Bill Costantino	Improvement Kata
2015	David Hamme	Customer Focussed Process Innovation
2015	Patrick Graupp, Gitte Jakobsen, John Vellema	Building a Global Learning Organization
2015	Michael Webb	Sales Process Excellence
2015	Jon Miller, Mike Wroblewski, Jaime Villafuerte	Creating a Kaizen Culture: Align the Organization, Achieve Breakthrough Results, and Sustain the Gains
2015	Peter M. Bernegger, Scott Webster	Fixed-Cycle Smoothed Production Improves Lean Performance for Make-to-Stock Manufacturing
2015	David J. Ballard	The Guide to Achieving STEEP Health Care: Baylor Scott & White Health's Quality Improvement Journey
2015	Kim Barnas	Beyond Heroes: A Lean Management System for Healthcare
2014	McKinsey & Company	The Lean Management Enterprise: A system for daily progress, meaningful purpose, and lasting value
2014	J.T. Black & Don T. Phillips	Lean Engineering: The Future has Arrived
2014	Gloria McVay, Frances Kennedy, Rosemary Fullerton	Accounting in the Lean Enterprise
2014	Paul Plsek	Accelerating Health Care Transformation with Lean and Innovation: The Virginia Mason Experience
2014	Judy Worth, Tom Shuker, Beau Keyte, Karl Ohaus, Jim Luckman, David Verble, Kirk Paluska, Todd Nickel	Perfecting Patient Journeys: Improving Patient Safety, Quality, And Satisfaction While Building Problem-Solving Skills
2014	Keivan Zokaei, Hunter Lovins, Andy Wood, Peter Hines	Creating a Lean and Green Business System: Techniques for Improving Profits and Sustainability
2014	David J. Ballard, Neil S. Fleming, Joel T. Allison, Paul B. Convery, Rosemary Luquire	Achieving STEEEP Health Care
2014	Adil Dalal	The 12 Pillars of Project Excellence: A Lean Approach to Improving Project Results
2014	Ronald Bercaw	Lean Leadership for Healthcare: Approaches to Lean Transformation
2014	Ian Glenday & Rick Sather	Lean RFS (Repetitive Flexible Supply): putting the pieces together
2014	Katherine Radeka	The Mastery of Innovation: A Field Guide to Lean Product Development
2014	Steve Gran, Robert Martichenko, Walt Miller & Roger Pearce	People: A Leader's day-to-day Guide to Building, Managing, and Sustaining Lean Organizations
2014	Mark Graban & Joseph E. Swartz	Healthcare Kaizen: Engaging Front-Line Staff in Sustainable Continuous Improvements
2013	Jerry Bussell	Anatomy of a Lean Leader
2013	Kevin Duggan	Design for Operational Excellence
2013	Gene Fliedner	Leading and Managing the Lean Management Process
2013	Thomas G. Zidel	Lean Done Right: Achieve and Maintain Reform in Your Healthcare Organization
2013	Naida Grunden & Charles Hagood	Lean-Led Hospital Design: Creating the Efficient Hospital of the Future
2013	Dennis Averill	Lean Sustainability
2013	Charles Protzman, George Mayzell MD, Joyce Kerpchar	Leveraging Lean in Healthcare: Transforming Your Enterprise into a High Quality Patient Care Delivery System
2013	Mike Martyn & Bryan Crowell	Own the Gap
2013	James Benson & Tonianne Barry	Personal Kanban
2013	John Touissant	Potent Medicine
2013	Dr. Sami Bahri & Bruce Hamilton	Single Patient Flow: Applying Lean Principles in Healthcare
2013	Ronald Bercaw	Taking Improvement from the Assembly Line to Healthcare, The Application of Lean with the Healthcare Industry
2013	Conrad Soltero & Patrice Boutier	The 7 Kata
2013	Josef Oehman, Bohdan Oppenheim, Deborah Secor, Eric Norman, Eric Rebentisch, Joseph Sopko, Marc Steuber, Rick Dove, Kambiz Moghaddam, Steve McNeal, Mark Bowie, Mohamed Ben-Daya, Wolf Altman, John Driessnack	The Guide to Lean Enablers for Managing Engineering Programs
2013	Allan Coletta	The Lean 3P Advantage
2013	Karen Martin	The Outstanding Organization
2013	Naida Grunden	The Pittsburgh Way to Efficient Healthcare: Improving Patient Care Using Toyota Based Methods
2013	Chris Ortiz	The Psychology of Lean Improvements
2012	Robert Martichenko & Kevin von Grabe	Building a Lean Fulfillment Stream
2012	Drew Locher	Lean Office and Service Simplified: The Definitive How-to Guide
2012	Bradley R. Staats, David J. Brunner, & David M. Upton	Lean principles, learning, and knowledge work: Evidence from a software services provider
2012	Raymond C. Floyd	Liquid Lean: Developing Lean Culture in the Process Industries
2012	John Toussaint & Roger A. Gerard	On the Mend: Revolutionizing Healthcare to Save Lives and Transform the Industry
2012	Pascal Dennis	The Remedy: Bringing Lean Thinking Out of the Factory to Transform the Entire Organization
2012	Jeffrey K. Liker & James K. Franz	The Toyota Way to Continuous Improvement
2012	Jeffrey K. Liker & Gary Convis	The Toyota Way to Lean Leadership
2012	Charles Kenney	Transforming Health Care: Virginia Mason Medical Center's Pursuit of the Perfect Patient Experience
2012	Dr. Gwendolyn D. Galsworth	Work That Makes Sense: Operator-Led Visuality
2011	Jeffrey K. Liker & Timothy N. Ogden	Toyota Under Fire: Lessons for Turning Crisis into Opportunity
2011	Steve Hoeft	Stories From My Sensei: Two Decades of Lessons Learned Implementing Toyota-Style Systems
2011	Mike Rother	Toyota Kata: Managing People for Improvement, Adaptiveness, and Superior Results
2011	Steven C. Bell & Michael A. Orzen	Lean IT: Enabling and Sustaining your Lean Transformation
2011	GBMP	Toast: Value Stream Mapping Video
2011	Dr. Sami Bahri	Follow the Learner
2011	Freddy Ballé and Michael Balle	The Lean Manager
2011	Bohdan W. Oppenheim, Earll M. Murrnan, Deborah A. Secor	Lean Enablers for Systems Engineering
2011	Ian Glenday	Breaking Through To Flow
2010	David Vrunt, John Kiff	Creating Lean Dealers
2010	Ian Glenday	Breaking Through to Flow
2010	Mark Hamel	The Kaizen Event Fieldbook
2009	Peter Hines, Pauline Found, Gary Griffiths, Richard Harrison	Staying Lean: Thriving Not Just Surviving
2009	Jeff Liker, Michael Hoseus	Toyota Culture
2009	Steven J. Spear	Chasing the Rabbit
2009	Mark Graban	Lean Hospitals: Improving Quality, Patient Safety, and Employee Satisfaction
2009	John Shook	Managing to Learn
2009	Durward K. Sobek II, Art Smalley	Understanding A3 Thinking
2008	Jerry Solomon	Accounting For World Class Operations
2008	Jean Cunningham	Easier, Simpler, Faster: Systems Strategy for Lean IT
2008	Pascal Dennis	Getting the Right Things Done: A Leader's Guide to Planning and Execution
2008	Allen Ward	Lean Product and Process Development
2008	Matthew May	The Elegant Solution: Toyota's Formula for Mastering Innovation
2008	Mike Martyn	Applying TWI to Retail Sales: Developing a Sales Boot Camp at La-Z-Boy Furniture Galleries
2007	Thomas Jackson	Hoshin Kanri for the Lean Enterprise: Developing Competitive Capabilities and Managing Profit
2007	Satoshi Hino	Inside the Mind of Toyota: Management Principles of Enduring Growth
2007	Peter Middleton, James Sutton	Lean Software Strategies: Proven Techniques for Managers and Developers
2007	James Morgan, Jeff Liker	The Toyota Product Development System: Integrated People, Process, and Technology
2007	Patrick Graupp, Robert Wrona	The TWI Workbook: Essential Skills for Supervisors
2007	H.Thomas Johnson	Lean Dilemma: Choose System Principles or Management Accounting Controls, Not Both
2006	Pascal Dennis	Andy & Me: Crisis and Transformation on the Lean Journey
2006	David Mann	Creating a Lean Culture: Tools to Sustain Lean Conversations
2006	Michael Balle, Freddy Balle	The Gold Mine: A Novel of Lean Turnaround
2006	Pascal Dennis	Lean Production Simplified: A Plain Language Guide to the World's Most Powerful Production System
2006	James P. Womack, Daniel T. Jones	Lean Solutions: How Companies and Customers Can Create Value and Wealth Together
2006	Jeffrey Liker, David Meier	The Toyota Way Fieldbook
2006	Donald Dinero	Training Within Industry: The Foundation of Lean
2006	Gwendolyn Galsworth	Visual Workplace-Visual Thinking: Creating Enterprise Excellence Through the Technologies of the Visual Workplace
2006	Steven J. Spear	Fixing Healthcare from the Inside, Today
2006	Bruce Hamilton	Toast Kaizen
2005	Norman Bodek	Kaikaku, The Power and Magic of Lean
2005	Jeff Liker	The Toyota Way
2005	Jerrold M. Solomon	Who's Counting? A Lean Accounting and Manufacturing Business Novel
2005	Steven Spear	Learning to Lead at Toyota
2005	Michael A. Lapre, Luk N. Van Wassenhove	Managing Learning Curves in Factories by Creating and Transferring Knowledge
2005	Art Smalley	Creating Level Pull
2005	Rich Harris, Chris Harris, Earl Wilson	Making Materials Flow
2005	Beau Keyte	The Complete Lean Enterprise: Value Stream Mapping for Administrative and Office Processes
2005	James M. Morgan	High Performance Product Development: A system Approach to a Lean Product Development Process
2005	Robert Conti	The Effects of Just-in-Time/Lean Production on Worker Job Stress
2004	Jean E. Cunningham, Orest J. Fiume, Emily Adams	Real Numbers: Management Accounting in a Lean Organization
2004	Ross & Associates, United States Environmental Protection Agency	Lean Manufacturing and the Environment: Research on Advanced Manufacturing Systems and the Environment and Recommendations for Leveraging Better Environmental Performance
2004	Rachna Shah, Peter T. Ward	Lean Manufacturing: Context, Practice Bundles, and Performance
2004	Steven J. Spear	The Essence of Just-In-Time: Embedding Diagnostic Tests in Work-Systems to Achieve Operational Excellence
2004	Douglas M. Stewart, John R. Grout	The Human Side of Mistake-Proofing
2004	Rosemary R. Fullerton, Chryl S. McWatters	The Role of Performance Measures and Incentive Systems in Relation to the Degree of JIT Implementation
2003	Bob Emiliani, David Stec, Lawrence Grasso, James Stodder	Better Thinking, Better Results: Using the Power of Lean as a Total Business Solution
2003	Nancy Hyer, Urban Wemmerlov	Reorganizing the Factory: Competing through Cellular Manufacturing
2003	Henry Ford	Today and Tomorrow: Commemorative Edition of Ford's 1926 Classic
2003	Mike Rother, Rick Harris	Creating Continuous Flow: An Action Guide for Managers, Engineers and Production Associates
2003	Dan Jones, Jim Womack	Seeing the Whole: Mapping the Extended Value Stream
2002	Jeffrey H. Dyer	Collaborative Advantage: Winning Through Extended Enterprise Supplier Networks
2002	Gary Conner	Lean Manufacturing for the Small Shop
2002	David S. Cochran, Joachin Linck, Patrick Neise	Evaluation of the Plant Design of Two Automotive Suppliers Suing the Manufacturing Systems Design Decomposition
2002	Productivity Press Development Team	The Eaton Lean System: An Interactive Introduction to Lean Manufacturing Principles
2002	SME	The Manufacturing Insight Video Series
2001	Stephen A. Ruffa, Michael J. Perozziello	Breaking the Cost Barrier: A Proven Approach to Managing and Implementing Lean
2001	Paul Hawken, Amory Lovins, L. Hunter Lovins	Natural Capitalism: Creating the Next Industrial Revolution
2001	H. Thomas Johnson, Anders Broms	Profit Beyond Measure: Extraordinary Results through Attention to Work and People
2001	Stefan Thoamke, Takahiro Fujimoto	The Effect of ‘Front-Loading’ Problem Solving on Product Development Performance
2001	Factory Logic Software	Streamline Software
2000	Takahiro Fujimoto	The Evolution of a Manufacturing System at Toyota
2000	Charles Standard, Dale Davis	Running Today's Factory
2000	Frederick H. Abernathy, John T. Dunlop, Janice H. Hammond, David Weil	A Stitch in Time
2000	Steven Spear, H. Kent Bowen	Decoding the DNA of the Toyota Production System
2000	Productivity Press Development Team	Productivity Press-Shopfloor Series
1999	Raymond N. Cheser	The Effect of Japanese Kaizen on Employee Motivation in U.S. Manufacturing
1999	Masaaki Imai	Gemba Kaizen: A Commonsense, Low Cost Approach to Management
1999	Japan Commission on Industrial Performance	Made in Japan: Revitalizing Japanese Manufacturing for Economic Growth
1999	Mike Rother, John Shook	Learning to See: Value Stream Mapping to Add Value and Eliminate Muda
1998	Jeffrey Liker	Becoming Lean: Inside Stories of U.S. Manufacturing
1998	Richard J. Schonberger	World Class Manufacturing: The Next Decade
1998	James P. Womack, Daniel T. Jones	Lean Thinking: Banish Waste and Create Wealth in Your Corporation
1997	Toshihiro Nishiguchi	Managing Product Development
1997	James W. Brackner, Richard L. Jenson, Clifford R. Skousen	Managing Accounting in Support of Manufacturing Excellence
1997	Roger S. Ahlbrandt, Richard J. Fruehan, Frank Giarratani	The Renaissance of American Steel: Lessons for Managers in Competitive Industries
1997	Allen Ward, Jeff Liker, John J. Christian, Durward K. Sobek II	The Second Toyota Paradox: How Delaying Decisions Can Make Better Cars Faster
1996	Jeff Liker, John E. Ettlie, John C. Campbell, Ron Roncarti, Cheryl Tanner	Engineered in Japan: Japanese Technology-Management Practices
1995	William F. Christopher, Carl G. Thor	The Handbook of Productivity Measurement and Improvement
1995	B. Joseph Pine II	Mass Customization: The New Frontier in Business Competition
1995	Toshihiro Nishiguchi	Strategic Industrial Sourcing-The Japanese Advantage
1995	Rajan R. Kamath, Jeff Liker	A Second Look at Product Development
1995	Everett E. Adam	Alternative Quality Improvement Practices & Organization Performance
1994	James P. Womack, Daniel T. Jones, Daniel Roos	The Machine That Changed the World
1994	Ronald G. Askin, M. George Mitwasi, Jeffrey B. Goldberg	Determining the Number of Kanbans in Multi-Item JIT Systems
1994	Maling Ebrahimpour, Barbara E. Withers	Employee Involvement in Quality Improvement: A Comparison of American and Japanese Manufacturing Firms Operating in the U.S.
1993	Satish Mehra, Anthony Inman	Determining the Critical Elements of JIT Implementation
1993	J.T. Black, Daniel Sipper	Decouplers in Robotic Manufacturing Cells: Concept & Analysis
1992	G. Gordon Schulmeyer	
1992	J.T. Black	
1992	Thomas Smith	
1992	Stephen L. Brown, Christian R. Sterling	
1991	Eugene Riven, H.L. Kang	
1991	Laura Beth Raiman	
1991	Glenn Milligan	
1991	Alan Robinson, Dean Schroeder	
1991	Christina Guidi, Frank Pantazopoaoulos, Charles Riceman	
1991	Jeffrey Brown	
1990	Elliott Weiss, John Leschke	
1990	Alan Robinson, Dean Schroeder	
1990	Jay Ward	
1990	DongPing Nie, Derrel Brown	
1990	Paul Doubek	
1989	Leslie Hiraoka	
1989	Marvin Lieberman, Lawrence Lau, Mark Williams	
1989	J.T. Black	
1989	Davis S. Cochran	
1989	Kristie K. Seawright	
1989	Hunglin Wang	
1989	Morris Speth	
1989	James Robertson	
1989	Leslie Noorlander	
