= Operational excellence =

Philosophy of business effectiveness

Operational Excellence (OE) is the systematic implementation of principles and tools designed to enhance organizational performance and create a culture focused on continuous improvement. It is intended to enable employees to identify, deliver, and enhance the flow of value to customers. Common frameworks associated with operational excellence include: lean management and Six Sigma, which emphasize efficiency, waste reduction, and quality improvement. Organizations that adopt these practices may report increased customer satisfaction and operational efficiency.

Operational Excellence leverages earlier continuous improvement methodologies such as Lean Thinking, Six Sigma, OKAPI [3], and scientific management [4]. The concept was introduced in the 1970s by Dr. Joseph M. Juran [4], who taught Japanese business leaders quality improvement methods. It gained prominence in the United States during the 1980s as a response to the competitive pressure from Japanese imports, leading to what some termed a "quality crisis".

== Key Components of Operational Excellence ==
- Customer Focus
- Continuous Improvement
- Standardization
- Efficiency and Waste Reduction
- Employee Engagement and Empowerment
- Data-Driven Decision Making
- Strategic Alignment

== Models of Operational Excellence ==
=== The Juran Model ===
In the early 1970s, Dr. Joseph M. Juran was one of the few experts at the time who taught Japanese business leaders how to improve quality. As more companies began to adopt the methods of Juran, William Edwards Deming, and others, Toyota's Operational Excellence movement grew. In contemporary manufacturing, operational excellence employs a strategic approach to achieve lean operations.

According to Juran's Model, there are five key components fundamental to operational excellence:

The first component, an Integrated Management System (IMS), offers a framework of processes and standards that help define the organization's direction, identify potential risks, mitigate those risks, manage change, and ensure continuous improvement. A single integrated management system may reduce overlap, redundancy, and conflict. Early adopters of this practice include companies such as ExxonMobil and Chevron, which have implemented the Operations Integrity Management System (OIMS) and the Operations Excellence Management System (OEMS) [8], respectively.

The second component, a culture of operational discipline, refers to the consistent adherence to established procedures and standards ensuring tasks are performed correctly and uniformly. This culture is based on five guiding principles derived from the practices of the United States Nuclear Navy. The guiding principles consist of integrity, a questioning attitude, level of knowledge, team backup, and formality. These principles define the expected behaviors of employees and explain how they contribute to achieving the goals and objectives of the organization.

The core components of the Juran Model for operational excellence are as follows:

1. Understand Juran's guiding principles, which provide the foundation for operational excellence.
2. Shift the organizational culture from viewing quality as a product attribute (often referred to as "little q") to recognizing it as a comprehensive customer experience (often referred to as "Big Q").
3. Recognize when and how to involve leadership and the workforce to enhance performance.
4. Establish an effective and efficient change infrastructure by utilizing appropriate tools and methods.
5. Focus on improving business process effectiveness and agility.

=== The Shingo Model ===
Devised by Dr. Shigeo Shingo, the Shingo Model encompasses ten guiding principles for operational excellence. The Shingo Institute, an organization that awards the Shingo Prize, has identified "Ten Guiding Principles in the Shingo Model" as forming the basis for building a sustainable culture of organizational excellence:

1. Respect every individual
2. Lead with humility
3. Seek perfection
4. Assure quality at the source
5. Flow and pull value
6. Embrace scientific thinking
7. Focus on process
8. Think systemically
9. Create constancy of purpose
10. Create value for the customer

=== The FLEX Methodology ===
The FLEX methodology, also known as PBED (Plan-Brief-Execute-Debrief), is an iterative management system initially developed for use by fighter pilots and later adapted for business contexts in 1998.

The methodology consists of four steps:

- Plan: Formulating a strategy and aligning objectives among team members.
- Brief: Effectively communicating the plan to the execution team to ensure understanding.
- Execute: Implementing the plan whilst focusing on the defined objectives.
- Debrief: Analyzing the execution results against the initial plan, reflect on mistakes and learn from them to improve future performance.

== See also ==
- PDCA
- Lean manufacturing
- Lean services
- Shingo Prize for Operational Excellence
- Six Sigma
- The Toyota Way
- Toyota Production System
