= Gwendolyn Galsworth =

American educationist

- Born: upper New York State
- Citizenship: American
- Education: Montclair State Teachers College, Sorbonne Indiana University Bloomington, Indiana (Masters and PhD)
- Occupations: Author, Consultant
- Organization: The Performance Group
- Known for: Focusing on Visual workplaces and visual management
- Awards: Shingo Research and Professional Publication Award 2011 and 2006

Gwendolyn Galsworth is an American author and consultant. Her books won multiple Shingo Prize awards in the Research and Professional Publication category.

Galsworth was one of the ten members of a team assembled by Norman Bodek in the early 1980s to document and explain what was then called The Japanese Manufacturing Miracle, exemplified by the Toyota Production System through books and resources from Japan.

== Early life and education ==
Galsworth was born in upper New York State. She graduated from Montclair State Teachers College. She started an acting career in New York, studying at the Gene Frankel Studio and performing in plays. She later enrolled in a Master’s Program/Hunter College in Special Education for the Deaf and Hearing Impaired.

Galsworth received both her Masters and PhD in Education and Statistics from Indiana University in Bloomington, Indiana.

== Awards ==
- 2024: Inducted into the Shingo Academy as lifetime member
- 2011: Awarded the Shingo Research and Professional Publication Award for her book, Work That Makes Sense: Operator-led Visuality
- 2006: Awarded the Shingo Research and Professional Publication Award for her book, Visual Workplace/Visual Thinking: Creating Enterprise Excellence Through the Technologies of the Visual Workplace

== Bibliography ==
- Smart Simple Design: Using Variety Effectiveness to Reduce Total Cost and Maximize Customer Selection (John Wiley, 1994)
- Visual Systems: Harnessing the Power of the Visual Workplace (Amacom, 1997). Visual Workplace/Visual Order Associate Handbook and Visual Workplace/Visual Order Instructor Guide (Visual-Lean Enterprise Press, 1998)
- Visual Workplace/Visual Thinking: Creating Enterprise Excellence Through the Technologies of the Visual Workplace (Visual-Lean Enterprise Press, 2005)
- Work That Makes Sense: Operator-Led Visuality (Visual-Lean Enterprise Press, 2011)
