= Spear (surname) =

Spear is a surname deriving from Middle and Old English spere ("spear"), variously intending a spearman, a spearmaker, or a person considered tall and thin in a manner reminiscent of a spear.

Notable people with the surname include:

- Albert Spear (1852–1929), justice on the Maine Supreme Judicial Court and President of the Maine Senate
- Allan Spear (1937–2008), American politician and educator from Minnesota
- Arthur Spear (1883–1946), English footballer
- Arthur Prince Spear (1879–1959), American painter
- Bernard Spear (1919–2003), English actor
- Bob Spear (1920–2014), founding director of the Birds of Vermont Museum, naturalist, birdwatcher and master woodcarver
- Burning Spear (born 1945), Jamaican roots rock reggae artist
- Catherine Swan Brown Spear (1813–1903), American reformer, educator, and abolitionist
- Charles Spear (1803–1863), American Universalist minister
- Chloe Spear (c. 1749–1815), African freedwoman and diarist
- Clay V. Spear (1913–1974), associate justice of the Idaho Supreme Court
- Duston Spear, American artist
- Ellis Spear (1834–1917), officer in the 20th Maine Volunteer Infantry Regiment who rose to the rank of general during the American Civil War
- Eric Spear (1908–1966), English composer of film music
- Francis Spear (1902–1979), English stained glass artist and lithographer
- Frederick Gordon Spear (1895–1980), British physician and researcher
- Harry Spear (1921–2006), American child actor
- Jeff Spear (born 1988), American sabre fencer
- John Murray Spear (1804–1887), American Spiritualist preacher
- John Spear (1848–1921), British Liberal Unionist politician
- Joseph Spear (d. 1837), British naval officer
- Karl Spear (1910–1981), American college football coach
- Laurinda Hope Spear (born 1950), American architect and landscape architect
- Lawrence York Spear (1870–1950), American naval officer and businessman
- Margaret Jane Spear, American politician
- Mary Spear (1913–2006), English cricketer
- Matt Spear (born 1970), American soccer coach
- Moncrieff J. Spear (1921–2016), American diplomat
- Mónica Spear (1984–2014), Miss Venezuela 2004
- Nikola Špear (1944–2017), Yugoslavian tennis player
- Patricia G. Spear (born 1942), American virologist
- Percival Spear (1901–1982) British historian of colonial and modern South Asia
- Richard E. Spear (born 1940), American art historian and professor
- Robert Spear, various people
- Roberta Spear (1948–2003), American poet
- Roger Ruskin Spear (born 1943), British musician and artist, founding member of the Bonzo Dog Doo-Dah Band
- Ruskin Spear (1911–1990), British artist
- Samuel P. Spear (1815–1875), American soldier in the Seminole, Mexican–American War, and American Civil Wars
- Steven J. Spear (born 1965), American researcher and author
- Terry Spear, award-winning American author
- Timothy L. Spear, Democratic member of the North Carolina General Assembly
- Tom Spear (1919–1968), Australian rules footballer
- Tony Spear, American space exploration project manager
- Walter Eric Spear (1921–2008), German physicist
- William T. Spear (1834–1913), U.S. Republican politician
- Winston Spear (born 1965), Canadian stand-up comedian and actor

== See also ==
- Variant English forms: Spears, Speare, Speares, Speer, Speir, Spier
- Related English forms: Shakespeare (surname), Shakeshaft
- Shapiro, main article on Jewish surnames including Spear as variant
