= James Speers =

James Speers may refer to:

- Jim Speers, Northern Ireland politician
- Robert James Speers (1882–1955), known as Jim, Canadian racetrack owner and racehorse breeder

== See also ==
- James Speirs ("Jimmy"; 1886–1917), Scottish footballer
- James G. Spears (1816–1869), American general who served in the Union Army during the American Civil War
- Spear (surname)
- Spears (surname)
- Speer, a surname
