= Spiers =

Spiers is an English surname. Notable people with the surname include:

- Alexander Spiers (1807–1869), English lexicographer
- Bob Spiers (1945–2008), British television director
- Carson Spiers (born 1997), American baseball player
- Cyril Spiers (1902–1967), English professional footballer and manager
- Dick Spiers (1937–2000), English footballer
- Edward Louis Spiers, later Edward Spears (1886–1974), British Army officer and politician
- Elizabeth Spiers (born 1976), the founding editor of gossip blog Gawker.com and the Wall Street gossip site dealbreaker.com
- Felix William Spiers (1832–1911), founder of Spiers & Pond, restaurateurs
- Hetty Spiers (1881–1973), theatre and film costumier and screenwriter
- John Spiers (born 1975), English squeezebox player, founder member of folk duo Spiers and Boden and Bellowhead
- Reg Spiers (born 1941), Australian athlete known for traveling in a wooden box from England to Australia
- Richard Phené Spiers (1838–1916), English architect and author
- Ronald I. Spiers (1925–2021), former American ambassador-diplomat and member of Diplomats and Military Commanders for Change

== Business ==
- Stewart Spiers, Scottish firm of plane-makers, founded in 1840, later Stewart Speirs Ltd [sic]

== See also ==
- Spears
- Speir
- Speirs
