= Spear (disambiguation) =

A spear is a pole weapon used for hunting and combat.

Spear may also refer to:

== Arts, entertainment, and media ==
- Spear (comics), a Marvel Comics supervillain
- Spear (film), a 2015 Australian film
- Spear (Pokémon), the Japanese name for Beedrill, a Pokémon character
- Spear (Griffith novel), a 2022 fantasy novella by Nicola Griffith
- The Spear (novel), a 1978 novel by James Herbert
- The Spear (painting), a 2010 painting by Brett Murray
- Spear's, a wealth management magazine

== Military ==
- Operation Spear (2005), US military action in Iraq
- SAS Spear, the first submarine of the South African Navy
- SPEAR 3, a European air-to-ground missile
- Spears, slang for nuclear weapons

== People with the name ==
- Spear (surname)
- Spear Lancaster, 2002 candidate for Governor of Maryland

== Sports ==
- Spear (wrestling), a professional wrestling attack
- Spear tackle, head-first thrust into the ground

== Other uses ==
- Spear (liturgy), used in the Byzantine-Rite Churches
- Cape Spear, in Newfoundland, Canada
- Asparagus spear, a stalk of asparagus
- Singapore Prisons Emergency Action Response, a department within the Singapore Prison Service
- Spear Lúin, Irish mythological treasure
- Spear side, the male line of a family
- SPEAR System or S.P.E.A.R., a self-defense system based on physics and physiology
- Special Program for Embassy Augmentation and Response, a US antiterrorism and policing force
- Stanford Positron Electron Asymmetric Ring, an electron-positron collider now part of the Stanford Synchrotron Radiation Lightsource facility

== See also ==
- Justice Spear (disambiguation)
- Speare, a surname
- Spearing (disambiguation)
- Spears (disambiguation)
