= Management system (open source) =

Management System (Open Source)
- Developer: DoD Components (Industry & Academic Partnerships)
- OS family: Integrates major elements of Toyota Production System
- Source model: Attribution-ShareAlike 4.0 International (CC BY-SA 4.0)
- Initial release: June 29, 1939; 87 years ago (Training Within Industry)
- Latest release: June 29, 2019; 7 years ago
- Repository: 'Management System 3.1'
- Marketing target: Organizational Manager; Functional Manager; Program Manager; Team Manager; Individual Manager ("manage your career")

Management System (Open Source) is a socio-technical system that leverages the cumulative knowledge of management practitioners and evidenced based research from the past 130 years. The system was developed by DoD components in partnership with industry experts and academic researchers and builds off of the US Department of Wars version 1.0 open source management system - Training Within Industry.

The system integrates the four organizational components of Product, Structure, Process and People. In addition, the system is based on the 4 capabilities of rapid problem solving underlying the Toyota Production System:

1. Design and Operate Work to See Problems (See Problems).
2. Solve Problems Close in Person, Place & Time (Solve Problems).
3. Capture and Share Knowledge from solving those problems (Share Knowledge).
4. Managers Coach their Team in capabilities 1-3 (Managers Coach).

Derived from the original research of Steven J. Spear (Harvard Business School, Massachusetts Institute for Technology), the system balances the two dimensions of high performing organizations: integrate the whole (product, structure, process & people); and increase the rate of problem solving to manage the whole (4 capabilities outlined above).

Fundamentally, the system sets the standards of management by outlining a doctrine of rules, tactics, techniques, procedures & terms. The standards are intended to motivate change by creating a tension between the organization's "current condition" and the "ideal condition" (i.e. True North).

The objective of the system is to deliver more value, in less time, at less cost relative to the competition (better, faster, cheaper). For the DoD, competition is defined by the threats posed by current and potential adversaries.

== Open Source (Many Names) ==
Over the last 25 years, the US Department of Defense has leveraged evidence based research in their attempt to improve the management capability of the Department. DoD's need for change comes from an increased threat of adversaries and the requirement to improve their effectiveness and efficiency. This requirement to improve effectiveness and efficiency comes from established laws for "achieving an integrated management system for business support areas within the Department of Defense" (e.g. Government Performance and Results Act of 1993 and section 904 of Public Law 110-181 of the National Defense Authorization Act 2008).

The concept of open source promotes a free exchange of ideas within the DoD community to drive creative, scientific and technological advancement. The Management System (Open Source) is a reference model that captures the underlying doctrine driving many of the DoD's efforts to improve. For example, the Chief of Naval Operations line of effort called High Velocity Learning is based on the 4 capabilities outlined above. In addition, The Distribution Management System is based on those same underlying capabilities. Given that many programs come and go, it is important that the Department of Defense captures and shares the underlying doctrine of management that evidenced based research shows to be valid for producing high performance organizations.

== Management Matters ==
"When we take stock of the productivity gains that drive our prosperity, technology gets all the credit. In fact, management is doing a lot of the heavy lifting" (Joan Magretta, Harvard Business School). A growing body of evidence based research is showing the correlation and causation of management's impact on organizational performance (productivity, growth, patents, profit, ROIC, etc.).

The Management System (Open Source) is based on this body of research and managerial practice. The research findings is best captured by Clayton Christensen, former Kim B. Clark Professor of Business Administration at the Harvard Business School (HBS): "Management is the most noble of professions if it's practiced well. No other occupation offers as many ways to help others learn and grow, take responsibility and be recognized for achievement, and contribute to the success of a team."

As a result, the system establishes the "practice routines" for the management profession. Evidenced based research in the field of practice shows that "practice makes permanent, so practice perfect". This is echoed in Vince Lombardi's admonishment - "Practice does not make perfect. Only perfect practice makes perfect". Therefore, the Management System outlines the practice routines that enable the profession to engage in daily and "deliberate practice" To be successful in the profession of management (as outlined by the Management System), the daily and deliberate practice routines require a manager to commit to three fundamental values: Respect for People, Continuous Improvement, and Customer First (similar to those stated in the Toyota Production System).

== Doctrine of Management ==
The Management System is a doctrine that outlines the fundamental rules, with supporting tactics, techniques, procedures and terms used for the conduct of managerial work in support of the DoD component's objectives. It is authoritative but requires judgment in application. Each organizational element of Product, Structure, Process and People outline the standards of management using the following construct:

- Rule: An explicit and validated instruction governing the thinking and actions of managerial work (i.e. how to think and what to do). Validated means proven true in a given circumstance.
- Tactic: The employment and ordered arrangement of elements (e.g., products, structures, processes and people) in relation to each other in order to achieve an objective. Employing a tactic may require integrating several techniques and procedures.
- Techniques: Effective and/or efficient methods used to perform tasks. Managers choose specific techniques based on the circumstance and objectives established.
- Procedures: Standard and detailed steps that prescribe how to perform specific tasks. They consist of a series of steps in a set order that are completed in the same way, regardless of circumstance.
- Terms: The words and definitions used in the conduct of managerial work.

== Underlying Research ==
- Product: The doctrine of product is heavily shaped by the research of Clayton Christensen (disruptive vs. sustaining innovation, job to be done), Michael Porter (competitive advantage for creating & capturing value) and Donald G. Reinertsen (cost of delay, the invisible product architecture).
- Structure: The doctrine of structure is heavily shaped by the research of Elliot Jaques (level of work, accountabilities & authorities) and Alfred D Chandler Jr. ("structure follows strategy").
- Process: The doctrine of process is heavily shaped by the research of Steven J. Spear (rules in use - decoding the DNA of Toyota).
- People: The doctrine of people is heavily shaped by the research of Chris Argyris (model I & II theory in use, ladder of inference, inquiry & advocacy) and Elliot Jaques (potential capability: commitment, problem solving capacity, knowledge & temperament).

== Underlying Management Practitioners ==
- Product: The advancement and application of product doctrine is best represented by Thomas Edison (phonograph, motion picture camera, practical electric light bulb) and Steve Jobs (Mac, iMac, Pixar, iPod, iTunes, iPhone, iPad).
- Structure: The advancement and application of structure doctrine is best represented by Andy Grove ("guy who drove the growth phase of Silicon Valley") and Hyman G. Rickover ("Father of the Nuclear Navy").
- Process: The advancement and application of process doctrine is best represented by Taiichi Ohno ("father of the Toyota Production System") and Henry Ford (continuous flow production).
- People: The advancement and application of people doctrine is best represented by all of the above management practitioners: Taiichi Ohno (adoption of Training Within Industry), Thomas Edison ("organized science and teamwork to the process of invention"), Steve Jobs (challenged people and whole industries to "Think Different"), Henry Ford (pioneer of "welfare capitalism"), Andy Grove ("training is the boss's job"...and training takes place between people..."meetings are the medium of management"), Hyman G. Rickover (his legacy of people development and technical achievement is undeniable: "United States Navy's continuing record of zero reactor accidents").

== Organizational Components (Rules - TTPs) ==
=== Product (Rule Statement, TTPs, Ideal Condition) ===
Rule Statement: Prioritize and develop products (or services) that solve the customer's “job to be done” with no “cost of delay”.

- Job to Be Done: TTP's to understand the motivation for why customers hire or fire products to help them get their job done.
- Market Time (Cost of Delay): TTP's to measure the time it takes to respond to market opportunities; and to prioritize development decisions by calculating the impact of time on value creation & capture.
- Create Value: TTP's to enable strategic choice by 1) classifying the type of product you are developing and 2) how to position it for competitive advantage.
- Capture Value: TTP's to capture a portion of the value you create in order to have a sustainable business model that continues to create value.

Ideal Condition:

Products designed and delivered that generate:

100% Value Creation

- Perfect Customer Satisfaction
- 0 “Cost of Delay” (customer impact)

100% Value Capture

- Revenue, Resources, Profits, Units
- 0 “Cost of Delay” (organization impact)

=== Structure (Rule Statement, TTPs, Ideal Condition) ===
Rule Statement: Structure the role relationships (vertical and functional) to solve problems that deliver products of value.

- Takt Time (Problems): TTP's to determine the demand on the structure to meet the “expected scope & frequency of problems” to manage the cross-functional flow of product (think Andon system).
- Role Alignment: TTP's to establish the vertical and functional groupings of work to meet the demand of problem solving.
- Role Relationship: TTP's to define authorities and accountabilities required for effective vertical and cross-functional role relationships.
- Role Responsibilities: TTP's to define the specific role responsibilities (how & what).

Ideal Condition:

Roles aligned and structured for:

- Clear Communication
- Perfect Information
- Effective Decision Making
- Disciplined Problem Solving
- Clear Accountabilities & Authorities

=== Process (Rule Statement, TTPs, Ideal Condition) ===
Rule Statement: Develop the process to deliver “just in time” (right product, right qty, right time, right cost).

- Takt Time (Product): TTP's to set the pace of production to match pace of customer demand (net available time / customer demand).
- One Piece Flow: TTP's to produce and move one product at a time (or in small batches) continuously across processing steps.
- Level Pull: TTP's to level the type & quantity of production over a fixed period of time; and a pull method of production control where downstream activities signal their needs to upstream activities.
- Standard Work: TTP's to define current best method for performing an activity (standard sequence, standard WIP and standard time).

Ideal Condition:

Process that produce and deliver the product:

- On-demand (actual customer pull)
- No waiting (0 lead-time)
- Zero Defect
- Perfect Safety (physical, emotional, professional)
- No Waste (over production, over processing, transport, inventory, movement, waiting, rework/defect)

=== People (Rule Statement, TTPs, Ideal Condition) ===
Rule Statement: Develop and deliver capable people “just in time” (right role, right qty, right time).

- Takt Time (People): TTP's to set the pace of developing capable people to match the pace of demand (roles to be filled).
- Assess the People: TTP's to assess the applied capability of people in their current role and potential capability for their future role.
- Develop the People: TTP's to develop the capability of people for their current role (coaching) and for future roles (mentoring).
- Source the People: TTP's to source people capable of being developed to fill current and future roles (outlined in “role responsibility”).

Ideal Condition:

Process that develops and delivers people capable for the role:

- Commitment to the role
- Problem solving capacity
- Knowledge and Abilities
- Positive Temperament (no minus T)

== Limitations ==
"All models are wrong, but some are useful", George E. P. Box. Business research has the potential of falling victim to what Phil Rosenzweig outlines in his book "The Halo Effect" (a book that criticizes pseudoscientific tendencies in the explanation of business performance). The Management System (Open Source) states that it leverages evidenced based research, but in reality, all research can fall victim to some of the below effects.

1. The Halo Effect: the cognitive bias in which the perception of one quality is contaminated by a more readily available quality (for example good-looking people being rated as more intelligent).In the context of business, observers think they are making judgements of a company's customer-focus, quality of leadership or other virtues, but their judgement is contaminated by indicators of company performance such as share price or profitability. Correlations of, for example, customer-focus with business success then become meaningless, because success was the basis for the measure of customer focus.
2. The Delusion of Correlation and Causality: mistakenly thinking that correlation is causation.
3. The Delusion of Single Explanations: arguments that factor X improves performance by 40% and factor Y improves by another 40%, so both at once will result in an 80% improvement. The fallacy is that X and Y might be very strongly correlated. E.g. X might improve performance by causing Y.
4. The Delusion of Connecting the Winning Dots: looking only at successful companies and finding their common features, without comparing them against unsuccessful companies.
5. The Delusion of Rigorous Research: Some authors boast of the amount of data that they have collected, as though that in itself made the conclusions of the research valid.
6. The Delusion of Lasting Success: the "secrets of success" books imply that lasting success is achievable, if only managers will follow their recommended approach. Rosenzweig argues that truly lasting success (outperforming the market for more than a generation) never happens in business.
7. The Delusion of Absolute Performance: market performance is down to what competitors do as well as what the company itself does. A company can do everything right and yet still fall behind.
8. The Delusion of the Wrong End of the Stick: getting cause the wrong way round. E.g. successful companies have a Corporate Social Responsibility policy. Should we infer that CSR contributes to success, or that profitable companies have money to spend on CSR?
9. The Delusion of Organisational Physics: the idea that business performance is non-chaotically determined by discoverable factors, so that there are rules for success out there if only we can find them.
