= Speirs =

== People ==
Speirs is a surname. Notable people with the surname include:

- Annie Speirs (1889–1926), British freestyle swimmer
- Bill Speirs (1952–2009), British politician
- Fraser Speirs (21st century), Glasgow-based harmonica player
- Gardner Speirs (born 1963), Scottish former footballer and manager
- Jimmy Speirs (1886–1917), Scottish football player
- Nicole Speirs (1983–2006), domestic violence murder victim
- Ronald Speirs (1920–2007), United States Army officer
- Steve Speirs (born 1965), British actor
- William Speirs Bruce (1867–1921), London-born Scottish polar scientist and oceanographer

== Business ==
- Stewart Speirs Ltd [sic], the registered name from c. 1933 of the firm of Scottish plane-makers Stewart Spiers

== See also ==
- Spears (disambiguation)
- Speir
- Spiers
