= Spears (disambiguation) =

Spears are pole weapons used for hunting and combat.

Spears may also refer to:

- Spears (surname), people with the surname Spears
- Spears (album), a 1985 album by Tribal Tech
- Spears, Kentucky
- Kubota Spears, Japanese Top-League rugby team
- Southern Spears, a South African rugby team
- Spears Motorsports, a defunct NASCAR Craftsman Truck Series team
- Spear's Wealth Management Survey, also known simply as Spear's

== See also ==
- Spear (disambiguation)
- Speers (disambiguation)
- Spears House (disambiguation)
