= Speer (disambiguation) =

Speer is a surname.

Speer may also refer to:

- Speer, Denver, a neighborhood of central Denver, Colorado
- Speer, Illinois
- CCI Ammunition or CCI/Speer, a manufacturer of ammunition
- Speer (mountain), in Switzerland
- Speer (ship), a former passenger ship on Lake Zurich, Switzerland

== See also ==
- Spear (disambiguation)
- Speer - Mattstock, a sub-range of the Appenzell Alps
