= Catherine Swan Brown Spear =

American reformer and educator

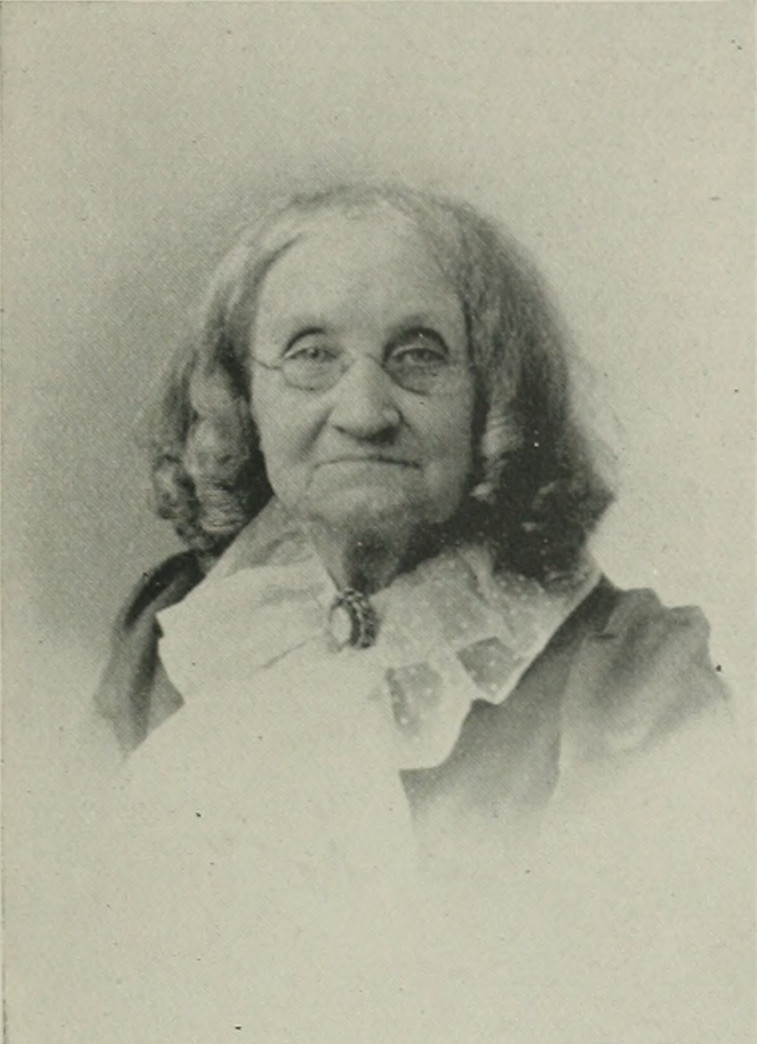
- Catherine Swan Brown Spear in A Woman of the Century (1893)
- Born: Catherine Swan; 6 August 1813; Worcester County, Massachusetts
- Died: June 29, 1903 (aged 89); Passaic, New Jersey
- Resting place: Cedar Lawn Cemetery, Paterson, Passaic County, New Jersey, USA
- Occupations: Reformer, abolitionist, educator
- Movement: Abolitionism, Temperance, Prison reform
- Spouse(s): Abel J. Brown (d. 1844); Charles Spear (d. 1863)

Catherine Swan Brown Spear (6 August 1813 – 29 June 1903) was an American reformer, educator, and abolitionist.

== Early life ==
Catherine Swan was born in Worcester County, Massachusetts on 6 August 1813, the oldest of seven children born to Samuel Swan and Clara (née Hale). Though her father was American-born, he was of Scottish descent, and her mother of English. Both were teachers. Catherine started school at the age of three, continuing until she was 18. She worked as a teacher for three years, and was actively involved in the anti-slavery movement from the age of 19.

== Activism ==
In 1843, Catherine Swan married fellow abolitionist Abel Brown, corresponding secretary and general agent of the Eastern New York Anti-slavery Society. The two met while Brown was in Massachusetts on an anti-slavery lecture tour, and Catherine became known for speaking and singing anti-slavery songs while accompanying her husband on subsequent trips. She was described as having 'unaffected vocal powers'. The couple travelled widely in the cause of the abolition and temperance movements, as well as assisting fugitive slaves. She later wrote:

Whatever the law makes property, is property, said Henry Clay, - but in the light of the "higher law", we held a different opinion, and acted accordingly.

After just 18 months of marriage, Abel Brown died one day before his 34th birthday. Catherine, pregnant at the time of his death, named her child Abel, and published a biography of her husband in 1849 in an effort to keep his memory alive, and hoping to 'stimulate others, to a life of greater self denial and perseverance in the cause of the persecuted'. Introducing the volume, compiled largely using Brown's correspondence and papers, she wrote:

It seems due to the character of an individual, who has labored long and assiduously to promote the best interests of his fellow-beings, that his life should be portrayed, after he has ceased to act in his corporeal nature, and when his memory, or the influence of his life, alone remains, endeared to his friends, and spectre-like to his foes; for, "though dead, he yet speaketh."

In 1855, Catherine Brown married her second husband, the Reverend Charles Spear of Boston. Spear, known as 'the prisoner's friend, was a minister and reformer, with whom Catherine visited many prisons, through which her own interest in issues of incarceration and reform grew. She continued to work and petition on behalf of the temperance movement, as well as being active in women's rights and suffrage, and the abolition of the death penalty. Charles Spear was an active, and early, opponent of the death penalty, who argued that 'The taking of his [the criminal's] life will not bring back his victim; it will not prevent others from the commission of crime.' The couple became partners in their efforts to abolish the death penalty, humanise prisons, and establish a halfway house for ex-convicts.

== Civil War work ==
Although a member of the Universal Peace Society, Catherine viewed the American Civil War as necessary, and undertook hospital work during its course, her husband having been appointed a chaplain in Washington, D.C. Charles Spear died in 1863, but she remained in Washington until the war's end.

== Later years ==
Spear moved to Passaic, New Jersey, where she died on 29 June 1903.
