= History of slavery in Massachusetts =

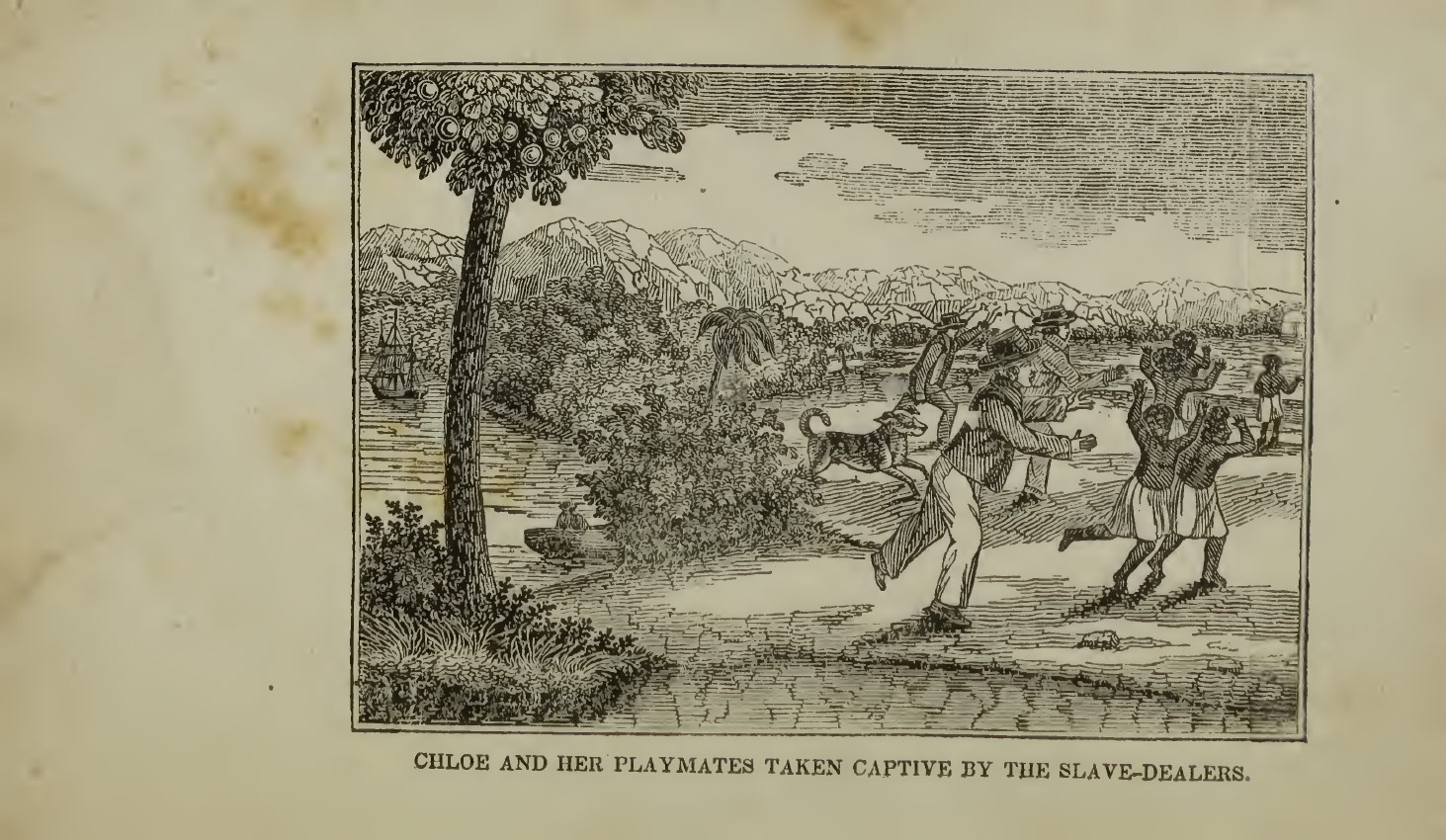
Illustration from the posthumously published biography of Chloe Spear, showing her abduction in Africa as a child; Spear was enslaved in Massachusetts from 1761 to until 1783.

Although slavery in the United States is typically associated with the Caribbean and the Antebellum American South, enslaved people existed to a lesser extent in New England: historians estimate that between 1755 and 1764, the Massachusetts enslaved population was approximately 2.2 percent of the total population; the slave population was generally concentrated in the industrial and coastal towns. Unlike in the American South, enslaved people in Massachusetts had legal rights, including the ability to file legal suits in court.

The practice of slavery in Massachusetts was ended gradually through case law. As an institution, it died out in the late 18th century through judicial actions litigated on behalf of slaves seeking manumission. Unlike some other jurisdictions, enslaved people in Massachusetts occupied a dual legal status of being both property and persons before the law, which entitled them to file legal suits in court. Prominent Massachusetts lawyer Benjamin Kent represented slaves in court against their masters as early as 1752. He won the first freedom suit in the British American colonies in 1766. The post-revolutionary court cases, starting in 1781, heard arguments contending that slavery was a violation of Christian principles and also a violation of the constitution of the Commonwealth. During the years 1781 to 1783, in three related cases known today as "the Quock Walker case," the Supreme Judicial Court applied the principle of judicial review to effectively abolish slavery in 1783 by declaring it incompatible with the state Constitution that had just been adopted in 1780. This did not have the effect of immediately freeing all slaves, however. Rather, it signaled to slaveowners that their right to own slaves would no longer be legally protected, and without that surety, it was no longer profitable to keep slaves in the first place. Those who owned the slaves then generally chose to replace the enslavement with some other arrangement, either indentured servitude for a fixed term or conventional, paid employment.

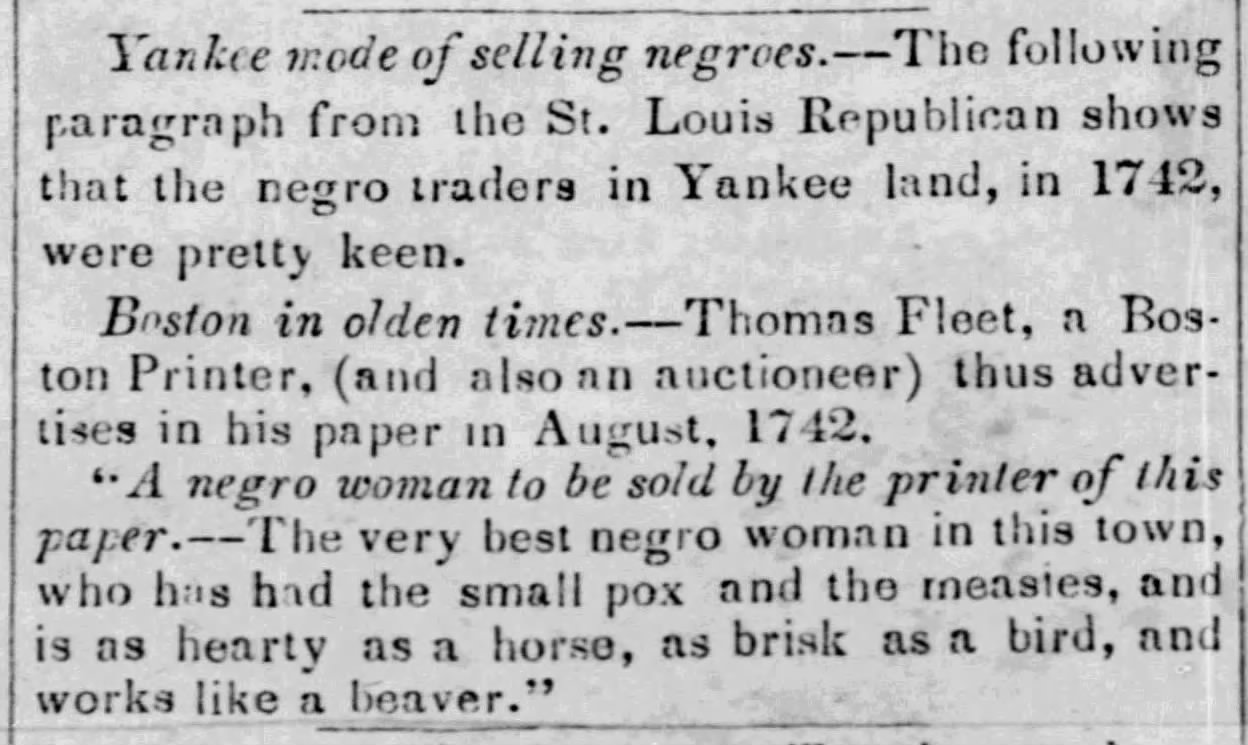
"Yankee mode of selling negroes" Arkansas Intelligencer, February 3, 1844, quotes from a 1742 Thomas Fleet ad for an enslaved woman

As a result of this, Massachusetts was the only state to have zero slaves enumerated on the 1790 federal census. (By 1790, the Vermont Republic had also officially ended slavery, but it was not admitted as a state until 1791.) Maine, in the 1790 Census, also lists no enslaved people among its population but did not become a state until 1820 (it was part of Massachusetts until 1820).

A large threat to former slaves and freemen living in Massachusetts, however, was that posed by slave catchers, whose profession was to look for runaway slaves who had successfully fled from the South and sheltered in the North. Under American law at the time, these individuals were subject to detention and return to slavery in any jurisdiction that had not yet ended slavery. Many abuses were also committed in which even blacks who were freeborn in the North could be falsely accused of being runaway slaves and spirited away to a life of slavery, as in the infamous case of Solomon Northup, who was freeborn in New York and kidnapped into slavery in Louisiana.

This ongoing uncertainty impelled the abolition movement in the North because it meant that even blacks living in free states could never truly be free until slavery was definitively ended all across the United States. Massachusetts became a leading center for abolitionism in early 19th-century America, with individual activists such as William Lloyd Garrison and Frederick Douglass as well as organizations like the Boston Vigilance Committee dedicated to advancing the cause.

The political tensions caused by the collision between abolitionism and pro-slavery forces in the United States led directly to the American Civil War in 1861. After the war's end in 1865, the Thirteenth Amendment to the United States Constitution was ratified by the states, including Massachusetts, which legally abolished slavery in the United States and ended the threat of enslavement or re-enslavement once and for all. This was the final date when slavery was formally outlawed in Massachusetts, although it had been a moribund institution for decades prior to that time.

After the end of legal slavery, however, racial segregation continued in Massachusetts as a de jure legal requirement in various contexts until the mid-20th century.

== History ==
=== Enslavement of indigenous peoples ===
The European enslavement of indigenous peoples in New England began with English sailors travelling though the region in the 16th and early 17th centuries, decades before the establishment of the Massachusetts Bay Colony. In 1605, James Rosier described in detail how he and his shipmates captured five Wabanaki men in what is today Maine: "it was as much as five or sixe of us could doe to get them into the light horseman. For they were strong and so naked as our best hold was by their long haire on their heads." Rosier and his shipmates took the captives to London, where they apparently hoped to instruct them in English and extract knowledge of Wabanaki government that might give them an advantage against their European competitors in the race to establish colonies in North America. Nine years later, in 1614, English sea captain Thomas Hunt abducted twenty-four Native Americans during a voyage to New England with John Smith. Plymouth Governor William Bradford later recalled that Hunt's goal was "to sell them for slaves in Spaine." One of Hunt's captives, a man named Squanto, made his way from Spain to England, where he learnt English, returned to North America, and assisted the Plymouth colonists in 1621.

Following the establishment of Plymouth Colony in 1620 and the Massachusetts Bay Colony in 1630, the colonists quickly incorporated the practice of enslaving indigenous people into the economic, social, and political fabric of New England. In the first decades of colonization, the primary mode of enslavement was the taking captives during war. This practice became especially prevalent during the Pequot War from 1636 to 1638. In the early days of the fighting, colonists brought Pequot captives from various small conflicts to the Massachusetts General Court, where they declared them officially enslaved. In an early example, the Court ordered in October 1636 that a Pequot person named Chausop "bee kept a slave for life to worke" within the colony. As the fighting escalated and the number of captives increased, however, the colonists began trading in enslaved Pequots on a much greater scale. They ceased to rely on the General Court and adopted a more ad hoc approach, selling captives into slavery without a legal declaration. Prior to 1641, no statutes guided this emerging trade in indigenous slaves. Instead, as historian Margaret Newell has argued, the colonists acted in self-interest and justified their practice after the fact, by referring to existing European notions of a just war (a theory later codified in the Body of Liberties). As noted by American historian Wendy Warren in her 2016 work New England Bound: Slavery and Colonization in Early America, "the movement of enslaved and captured people around the Atlantic world also was, by the seventeenth century, an accepted reality."

The enslavement of the Pequots reached its apex in May 1637, when New England colonists and their Mohegan and Narragansett allies attacked and massacred hundreds of Pequot men, women, and children near the Mystic River. The surviving captives, mostly women and children, were enslaved and divided amongst the victors and spread throughout region. The colonial militia took many captives directly, having been promised slaves as a reward for fighting. This resulted in a scramble to claim the most promising captives. Israel Stoughton hinted at the grotesque process in a letter to John Winthrop, the Governor of Massachusetts, in 1637: "ther is one [Pequot]... that is the fairest and largest that I saw amongst them... it is my desire to have her for a servant.... Liftenant Davenport also desireth one, to witt a tall one that hath 3 strokes upon her stummach." Captives not taken by individual militiamen were brought to Boston, where colonial leaders used them as field laborers and household servants, or sold them to planters in Barbados and Bermuda.

The enslavement of indigenous people in Massachusetts slowed in the decades after the Pequot War, but it rose to new heights during the violence surrounding King Philip's War in the mid-1670s. As New England colonists mobilized militia forces against an indigenous coalition of Narragansett, Wampanoag, and Nipmuc communities, they returned to the now familiar tactic of capture and enslavement. According to historian Margaret Newell, the desire for captives formed a "central preoccupation" for the colonists, often leading to a further escalation of the conflict. On the indigenous side, the fear of enslavement and sale to sugar plantations in the Caribbean dissuaded participants from surrender and encouraged the weakened nations to continue fighting. Some young men told an interpreter near the end of the war in 1676 that they would be inclined to make peace, but they were confident they would be enslaved if they did: "why shall wee have peace to bee made slaves, & either be kild or sent away to sea to Barbadoes... Let us live as long as wee can & die like men, & not live to bee enslaved." Their fears proved well-founded. A few months later, in the fall of 1676, a ship named the Seaflower left Boston with 180 "heathen... men, women and children" who had been "sentenced & [condemned] to Perpetuall Servitude & slavery." As in the aftermath of the Pequot War, hundreds of captives—both combatants and non-combatants—were taken as slaves by the colonial militia, sold to Massachusetts households, or shipped abroad to pay the colonies' war debt.

The rate of indigenous slavery declined in Massachusetts as the violence of King Philip's War faded and the 18th century began, but the reliance on coerced labor did not end. While fewer Native Americans were formally enslaved via capture, colonial courts began sentencing indigenous residents in the colony to terms of involuntary servitude for alleged thefts, a failure to pay debts, or committing acts of violence. In the neighboring colony of Rhode Island, courts often seized indigenous children from mothers, who they deemed "disorderly", and offered them as indentured servants to colonists. While these various indenture contracts were definite in theory, abuses were common, terms were long, and involuntary servants with terms over two years could be sold and exchanged around the region.

=== Importation of enslaved Africans ===
While English colonists in Massachusetts were establishing a consistent trade in indigenous slaves in the 17th century, they also began purchasing enslaved Africans. These processes were deeply intertwined: in 1638, the slave ship Desire carried indigenous captives to the Caribbean for sale into slavery and returned with the first documented shipment of enslaved Africans in New England. This reciprocal trade continued throughout the 17th century, as merchants and colonial governments exported enslaved Native Americans and traded them for more desirable African laborers. Large slaving ships rarely sailed directly from Africa to Massachusetts, as they occasionally did to Charleston, South Carolina. Instead, merchant ships travelling between the port towns of Salem and Boston frequently returned with enslaved Africans. This continuous flow of enslaved laborers benefitted colonists by simultaneously removing indigenous populations and meeting expanding labor needs.

In addition to bringing enslaved Africans to New England, residents of Massachusetts and Plymouth also participated in the broader Atlantic slave trade. At least 19 voyages in the 17th century departed from New England, purchased or captured slaves in Africa, and carried them to the Caribbean for sale. While these slave traders usually sold the majority of their human cargo in the Caribbean, many brought small numbers back to New England. One Rhode Island merchant in 1717 reminded his brother of this profitable trade, writing: "if you cannot sell all your slaves [in the West Indies] ... bring some of them home; I believe they will sell well."

Given the sparse records, lack of a regulatory regime and general indifference to the presence of slavery, it is impossible to know exactly how many enslaved Africans were brought to Massachusetts throughout the colonial period. Gregory O'Malley has estimated that around 9,813 Africans were brought directly to New England between 1638 and 1770, in addition to 3,870 who arrived through the Caribbean, but this is a rough estimate. Regardless of the exact number, enslaved Africans certainly constituted a significant labor force and a notable portion of the community throughout the colonial period of Massachusetts history.

=== Law 1641–1703 ===
In 1641, Massachusetts passed its Body of Liberties, which gave legal sanction to certain kinds of slavery.

There shall never be any bond slaverie, villinage or captivitie amongst us unless it be lawfull captives taken in just warres, and such strangers as willingly selle themselves or are sold to us. And these shall have all the liberties and Christian usages which the law of God established in Israel concerning such persons doeth morally require. This exempts none from servitude who shall be judged thereto by Authoritie.

Wiecek notes that the reference to "strangers" is derived from Leviticus 25: 39–55 and explains that they could be ruled and sold as slaves. For the Puritans and citizens of the colony, "strangers" would eventually mean Native Americans and Africans. Even though the Body of Liberties excluded many forms of slavery, it did recognize four legitimate bases of slavery. Slaves could legally be obtained if they were captives resulting from war, sold themselves into slavery, were purchased as slaves from elsewhere, or were sentenced to slavery through the governing authority. Whereas this made Massachusetts the first colony to authorize slavery through legislation, the Commonwealth made sure the law was respected. In 1645, on determining that the Boston merchantman Rainbow had brought to Massachusetts two kidnapped blacks, the court mandated that they be returned to Africa and that a letter of apology be delivered to their African community. In 1670, Massachusetts made it legal for the children of slaves to be sold into bondage. By 1680, the colony had laws restricting the movements of blacks. A 1703 law required owners to post a bond for all slaves to protect towns in the case that a slave became indigent should the master refuse to continue caring for him or her.

=== 18th century abolitionism ===
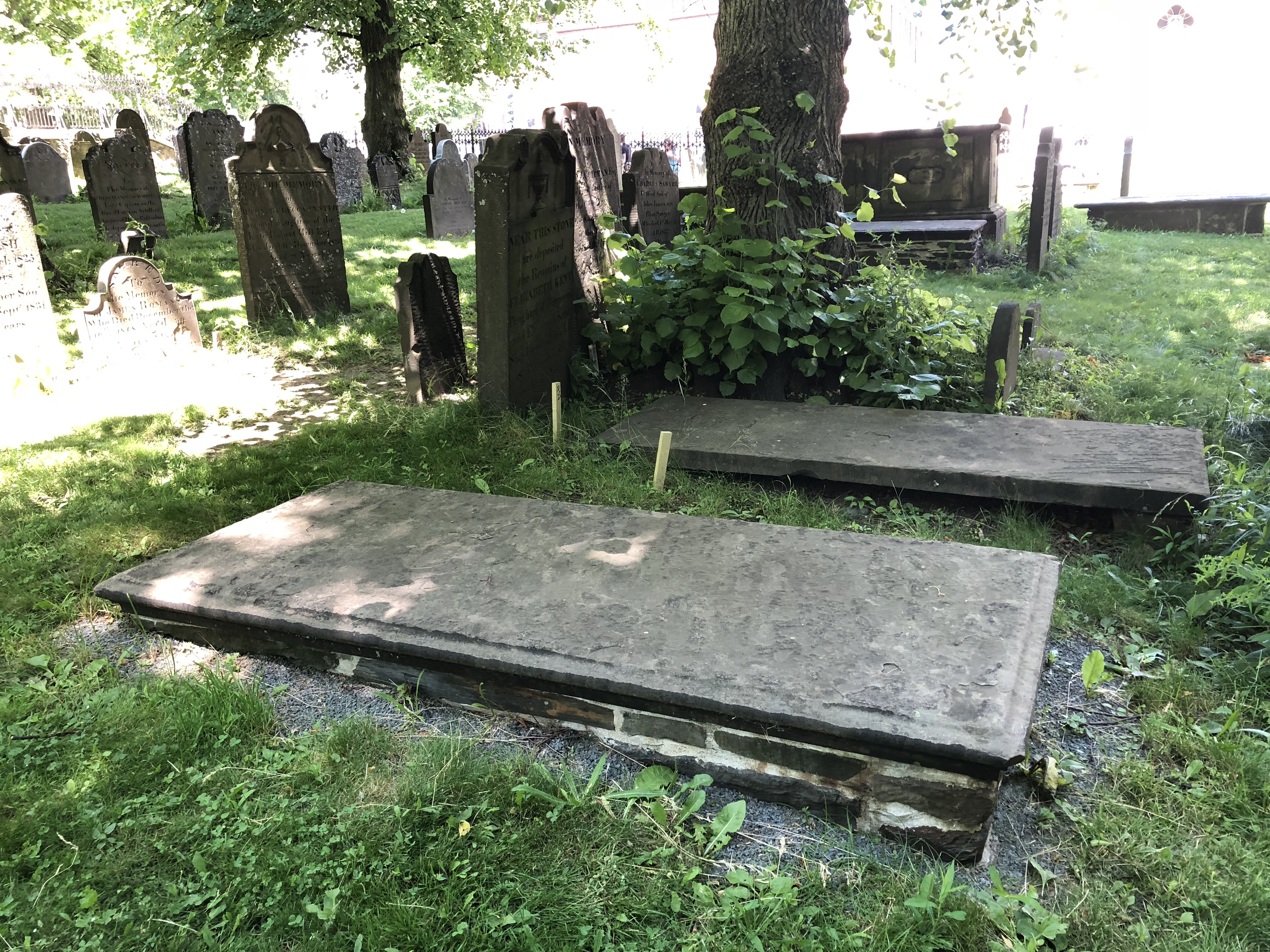
Benjamin Kent

By the mid-18th century, the enslavement of Africans had become a common practice in Massachusetts. A 1754 census listed over 2700 adult slaves in the colony. However, abolitionist sentiment was growing, especially when the philosophical underpinnings of independence and democracy became commonly discussed in the colony. While Massachusetts did derive wealth from the triangular trade, as well as from supplying clothing, implements and other goods to the plantation economy, its merchants and mixed economy were never as dependent on slave labor as the Southern Colonies' were. As a component of the British Empire with a separate jurisdiction, the Massachusetts courts noted, but were not bound by, the decision in England in 1772 of the case Somerset v Stewart, which found that there was no basis for slavery on English soil, as Britain's Parliament had never passed an act specifically authorizing it. (Maritime trade in slaves, which was quite lucrative, would continue in the British Empire until the passage of the Slave Trade Act 1807 prohibited the slave trade altogether within its territory.)

==== Freedom suits ====
Between 1764 and 1774, seventeen slaves appeared in Massachusetts courts to sue their owners for freedom. In 1766, John Adams' colleague Benjamin Kent won the first trial in the United States (and Massachusetts) to free a slave (Slew vs. Whipple). There were three other trials that are noteworthy, two civil and one criminal. All three took place during the American Revolutionary War, when thoughts about the equality of all people were frequently voiced, and especially after the new Massachusetts constitution was passed in 1780. The civil cases were Jennison v. Caldwell (for "deprivation of the benefit of his servant, Walker"), apparently heard and decided first, and Quock Walker v. Jennison (for assault and battery), both heard by the Worcester County Court of Common Pleas on June 12, 1781.

Jennison v. Caldwell

A man named Jennison argued that one Caldwell had enticed away his employee Walker. The court found in his favor and awarded Jennison 25 pounds compensation.

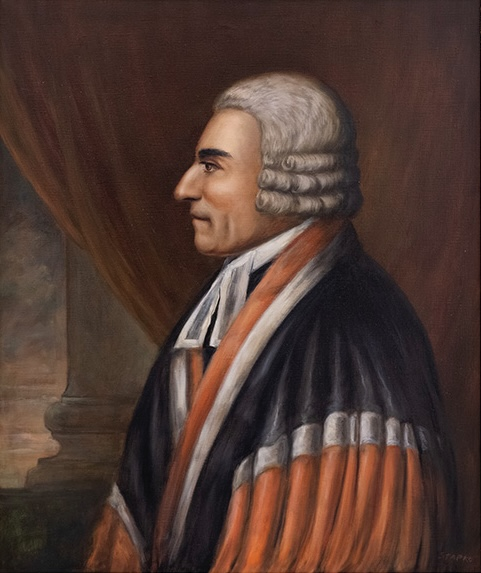
Chief Justice William Cushing

Quock Walker v. Jennison

This 1781 case involved a slave named Quock Walker in Worcester County Court of Common Pleas. Chief Justice William Cushing instructed the jury:

As to the doctrine of slavery and the right of Christians to hold Africans in perpetual servitude, and sell and treat them as we do our horses and cattle, that (it is true) has been heretofore countenanced by the Province Laws formerly, but nowhere is it expressly enacted or established. It has been a usage – a usage which took its origin from the practice of some of the European nations, and the regulations of British government respecting the then Colonies, for the benefit of trade and wealth. But whatever sentiments have formerly prevailed in this particular or slid in upon us by the example of others, a different idea has taken place with the people of America, more favorable to the natural rights of mankind, and to that natural, innate desire of Liberty, with which Heaven (without regard to color, complexion, or shape of noses-features) has inspired all the human race. And upon this ground our Constitution of Government, by which the people of this Commonwealth have solemnly bound themselves, sets out with declaring that all men are born free and equal – and that every subject is entitled to liberty, and to have it guarded by the laws, as well as life and property – and in short is totally repugnant to the idea of being born slaves. This being the case, I think the idea of slavery is inconsistent with our own conduct and Constitution; and there can be no such thing as perpetual servitude of a rational creature, unless his liberty is forfeited by some criminal conduct or given up by personal consent or contract ...

The Walker case had been opened by the attorney to consider whether a previous master's promise to free Walker gave him a right to freedom after that master had died. Walker's lawyers argued that the concept of slavery was contrary to the Bible and the new Massachusetts Constitution (1780). The jury decided that Walker was a free man under the constitution and awarded him 50 pounds in damages.

Both decisions were appealed. Jennison's appeal of Walker's freedom was rejected in September 1781 by the Massachusetts Supreme Judicial Court, either because he failed to appear or because his lawyers did not submit the required court papers. The Caldwells won the other appeal; a jury concurred that Walker was a free man, and therefore the defendants were entitled to employ him.

Commonwealth v. Jennison

In September 1781, a third case was filed by the Attorney General against Jennison, Commonwealth v. Jennison, for criminal assault and battery of Walker. In his charge to the jury, Chief Justice William Cushing stated, "Without resorting to implication in constructing the constitution, slavery is ... as effectively abolished as it can be by the granting of rights and privileges wholly incompatible and repugnant to its existence." This has been taken as setting the groundwork for the end of slavery in the state. On April 20, 1783, Jennison was found guilty and fined 40 shillings.

Aftermath of the trials

While Chief Justice Cushing's opinion in effect should have ended slavery in Massachusetts, the state never formally abolished slavery until the passage of the Thirteenth Amendment to the United States Constitution in 1865. Some possible reasons for this are that state legislators were either unable or unwilling to address slave-owners' concerns about losing their financial "investment", and non-slave owning white citizens' concerns that if slavery were abolished, the freed slaves could become a burden on the community. Some even feared that escaped slaves from other states would flood Massachusetts.

The Massachusetts Supreme Court decisions in Walker v. Jennison and Commonwealth v. Jennison established the basis for ending slavery in Massachusetts on constitutional grounds, but no law or amendment to the state constitution was passed. Instead slavery gradually ended "voluntarily" in the state over the next decade. The decisions in the Elizabeth Freeman and Quock Walker trials had removed its legal support and slavery was said to end by erosion. Some masters manumitted their slaves formally and arranged to pay them wages for continued labor. Other slaves were "freed" but were restricted as indentured servants for extended periods. By 1790, the federal census recorded no slaves in the state.

== See also ==
- Abolitionism in the United States
- Anthony Burns
- Elizabeth Freeman
- Tituba, an enslaved Carib woman from Barbados who played a key role in the Salem witch trials
- New England Anti-Slavery Society
- Slavery in Massachusetts – An essay by Henry David Thoreau
