= Jenny Slew =

Jenny Slew (c. 1719 – after 1765) was one of the first enslaved Black Americans to sue for her freedom, and the first person to succeed through trial by jury. Her lawyer was Benjamin Kent.

== Biography ==
=== Early life ===
Jenny Slew was born around 1719 to a free white woman, Betty Slew, and a man of African descent, who was likely enslaved. Slew lived a life as a free woman in Ipswich, Massachusetts up until 1762.

=== Marriages ===
Slew was married several times, all to enslaved men.

=== Kidnapping ===
In January 1762, when Slew was forty-three, she was kidnapped from her home in Ipswich and enslaved by John Whipple Jr.

== Slew vs. Whipple ==
In 1765, three years after her kidnapping, Slew brought a suit to court. She demanded her freedom and 25 pounds in damages, charging Whipple with violating her liberty. Most colonies denied enslaved people the right to sue in court, but Massachusetts allowed enslaved people to bring forward civil suits, even though they would still be regarded as property. Furthermore, most civil suits were brought by men. Slew's attorney Benjamin Kent argued that her mother was a white and free woman, so she was free. In the colonies, a child's legal status descended from a mother at the time. Slew filed her complaint in the Inferior Court of Common Pleas in Newburyport which threw out her petition since she filed under the name "Jenny Slew, Spinster". The court argued that such a name was incorrect since she had been married. Slew was charged with the expense of the suit.

A year later, Slew brought an appeal to the Essex Superior Court of Judicature in Salem, Massachusetts, where she faced a trial by jury. The jury's members were composed of "white Gentlemen". Whipple argued that Slew could not prove that she was free and that he owned proof of sale for when he purchased her. He also argued that Slew also did not have any legal rights since she was married and thus under the rulings of her husband. However, Slew was not married during the time of the trials, and her marriages had been to enslaved men. In all of the colonies at that time, the law did not legalize marriages between enslaved people. Thus, the Superior considered Slew a "spinster" and was able to sue for her freedom. The superior court reversed the ruling by deciding that whether a child was enslaved or not was determined by the mother's race. Slew won her freedom and was awarded her court costs and four pounds in damages.

John Adams, future president of the United States, was most likely present at Slew's trial. Adams has records of the trial in his legal papers, and according to one of his diary entries on November 5, 1766, Adams wrote about a trial of a "mulatto woman... suing for liberty" against a white man accused of kidnapping.

== See also ==
- Elizabeth Freeman
