= Benjamin Kent =

American lawyer active during the American Revolution

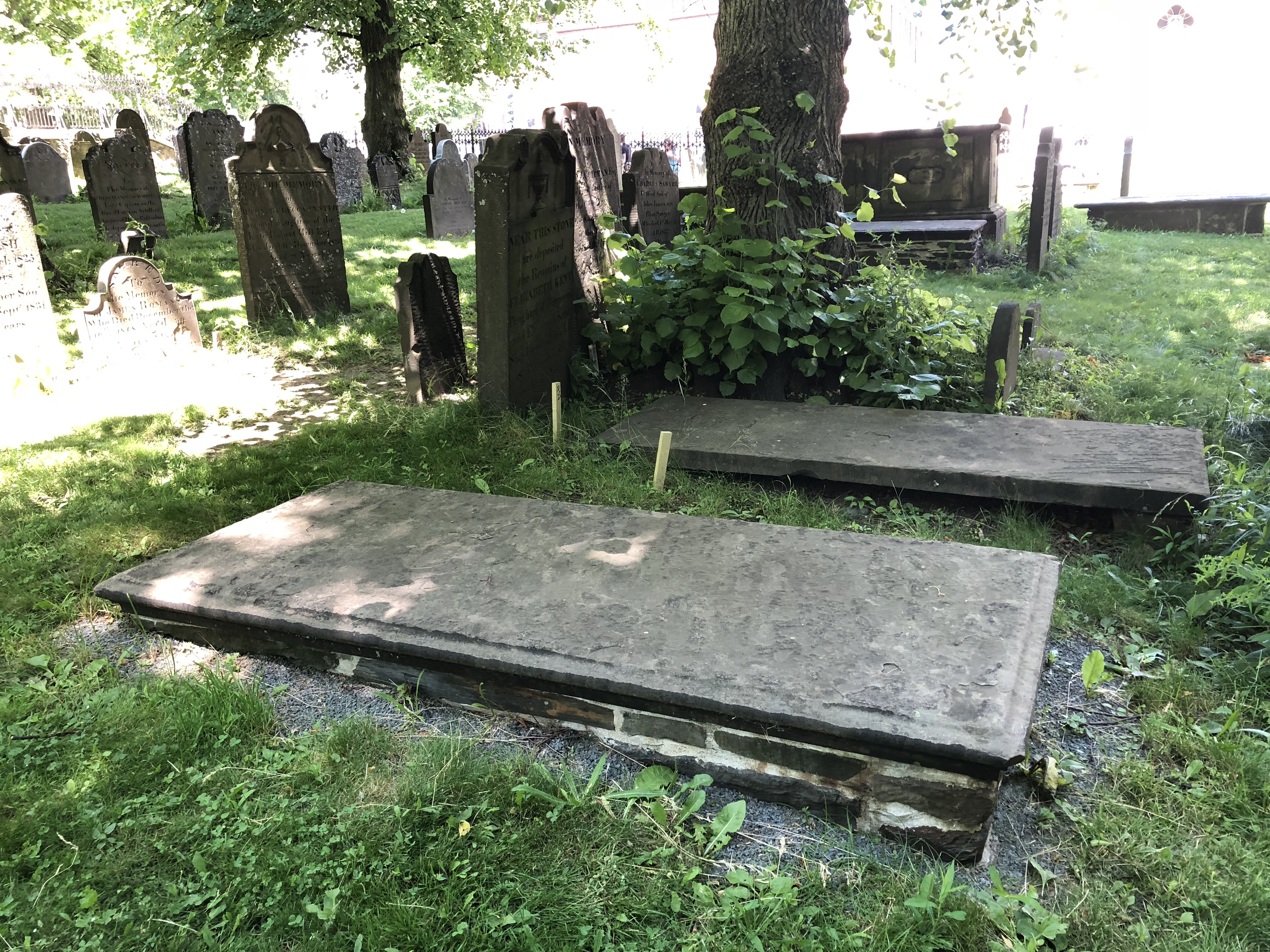
- Benjamin Kent, Old Burying Ground, Halifax, Nova Scotia
- Born: 13 June 1708; Boston, Massachusetts, British America
- Died: 22 October 1788 (aged 80); Halifax, Nova Scotia
- Resting place: Old Burying Ground
- Education: Harvard College
- Occupation: Lawyer
- Known for: Abolitionist, Attorney General
- Spouse: Elizabeth Watts
- Children: 4

Signature
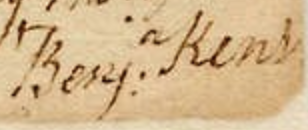

Benjamin Kent (1708–1788) was a Massachusetts Attorney General (1776–1777) and then acting Attorney General during much of Robert Treat Paine's tenure (1777–1785). He was appointed seven successive terms. Prior to the American Revolution, Kent was notable for his representation of slaves suing their masters for their freedom, which contributed to the demise of slavery in Massachusetts. He was a member of the North End Caucus and prominent member of the Sons of Liberty, which formed to protest the passage of the Stamp Act of 1765. The efforts of the Sons of Liberty created the foundation for the Boston Tea Party. Kent called for independence early in the American Revolution.

== Career ==
Kent graduated Harvard College in the class of 1727. In 1731, he served as chaplain at Fort George, Maine, and preached to the settlers at Brunswick. He was ordained as minister of the Marlborough Congregational church in 1733, where charges of heresy were soon leveled against him "due to his public questioning of the doctrines of the Trinity, of Absolute Election, and of Infant Damnation." Following his dismissal, Kent successfully sued the Town of Marlborough for the balance of his fees and salary due.

Kent then studied for the bar and began practicing in Boston in 1739, when there were only seven lawyers in the city, among whom he was at first "the Chimney sweeper of the Bar, into whose black dock entered every dirty action." He lived on the north side of King's Street (present-day State Street, Boston) by the north end of the First Town-House, Boston.

He handled divorces, and represented numerous slaves in their attempts to gain their freedom, including the case of a slave Pompey suing his master Benjamin Faneuil. Kent was the first lawyer in the United States to win a case to free a slave, Jenny Slew, in 1766. He also won a trial in the Old County Courthouse for a slave named Ceasar Watson (1771). Kent also handled Lucy Pernam's divorce and the freedom suits of Rose and Salem Orne.

On 1 April 1776, Kent became Attorney General of Massachusetts.

Kent was occasionally a guest at the Old Colony Club, whose members included John Adams. Kent has been described as one of Adams's "role-models in the elite of the Boston bar."

=== American Revolution ===
Kent was a senior member of the Sons of Liberty in Boston and maintained correspondence with John Wilkes. On the eve of the American Revolution he was reported to be a member of more town committees than any other Bostonian. After the Siege of Boston, Kent urged Adams to create the Declaration of Independence:

"It is as certain that the Colonies Will be wholly divorced from that Accursed Kingdom calld Great Britain, as that there will be any eclipses of the Sun or Moon this year... you will have nothing to do, but to Convince 'em that the present time to make a final declaration of Independence is the best."

In response, Adams assured Kent that the "'Declarations in Words' of What is every day manifested in Deeds of the most determined Nature" was forthcoming.

On August 4, 1776, Kent wrote Samuel Adams, "It is GOD's doing the bringing about his truly astonishing and unparalled'd union the declaration of Independence."

The loyalist Sampson Salter Blowers married Kent's daughter Elizabeth. When the Revolutionary War began, as Attorney General, Kent was forced to briefly to hold his son-in-law Blowers in jail for being a loyalist. In 1782, Kent's daughter Elizabeth fell ill in New York and he petitioned to have her return to Boston. The petition was refused and she departed for Nova Scotia.

Governor Thomas Cushing sent Kent to Halifax to retrieve the probate records for Suffolk County, Massachusetts after the Revolution in 1784. The records had been taken by the son of Edward Winslow (scholar) and given to the loyalist judge Foster Hutchinson, who had left Boston on the eve of the Revolution (1776). Nova Scotia Governor John Parr facilitated the negotiations with Foster, which led to Cushing returning to Massachusetts with the legal documents.

== Personal life ==
Kent was the son of Joseph Kent of Charlestown, Massachusetts, and was baptised in June 1708 at First Parish in Cambridge. In 1740 he married Elizabeth Watts in Chelsea, with whom he had three daughters, Elizabeth, Ann, and Sally. His daughter Sally married Sampson Salter Blowers, who was a loyalist.

When Blowers departed for Halifax after the Revolution, he was joined by Kent's wife and daughters. Kent, at age 78, rejoined them in 1785. He died there three years later and is buried in the Old Burying Ground.

== Legacy ==
John Adams included Kent in the "long catalogue of illustrious men, who were agents in the Revolution." Benjamin Franklin wrote, upon hearing of Kent's death: "Our poor friend Ben Kent is gone; I hope to the Regions of the Blessed, or at least to some Place where Souls are prepared for those Regions. . . . I found my Hope on this, that tho' not so orthodox as you and I, he was an honest Man, and had his Virtues. If he had any Hypocrisy it was of that inverted kind, with which a Man is not so bad as he seems to be."

== See also ==
- History of slavery in Massachusetts
- Abolitionism in the United States
- Nova Scotia in the American Revolution

Legal offices
Vacant Title last held by Jonathan Sewall as Attorney General of the Province of Massachusetts Bay	Attorney General of Massachusetts; 1776–1777	Succeeded by Robert Treat Paine
