= Speers =

Speers may refer to

== People ==
- David Speers, Australian journalist
- Hall Speers, Irish Anglican bishop

== Places ==
- Speers, Pennsylvania
- Speers, Saskatchewan
- Speers Point, New South Wales
- Speers, a town in Friesland

== Music ==
- Speer Family, also known as the Speers

== Television ==
- Speers Tonight, an Australian news program

== See also ==
- Spears (disambiguation)
- Speirs
- Speer (disambiguation)
