= Spearing =

Spearing may refer to:

== People ==
- A. C. Spearing (born 1936), Professor of English at the University of Virginia
- Glenn Spearing (born 1985), Irish darts player
- James Z. Spearing (1864–1942), American politician
- Jay Spearing (born 1988), English footballer
- Nigel Spearing (born 1930), English politician
- Ruth Spearing, New Zealand haematologist
- Tony Spearing (born 1964), English footballer

== Other ==
- A penalty in ice hockey
- Spearing (gridiron football) a penalty in American and Canadian football
- Spear tackle a type of foul tackle in rugby and Australian Rules football
- Spearfishing

== See also ==
- Spear (disambiguation)
