= Arthur Prince Spear =

American painter

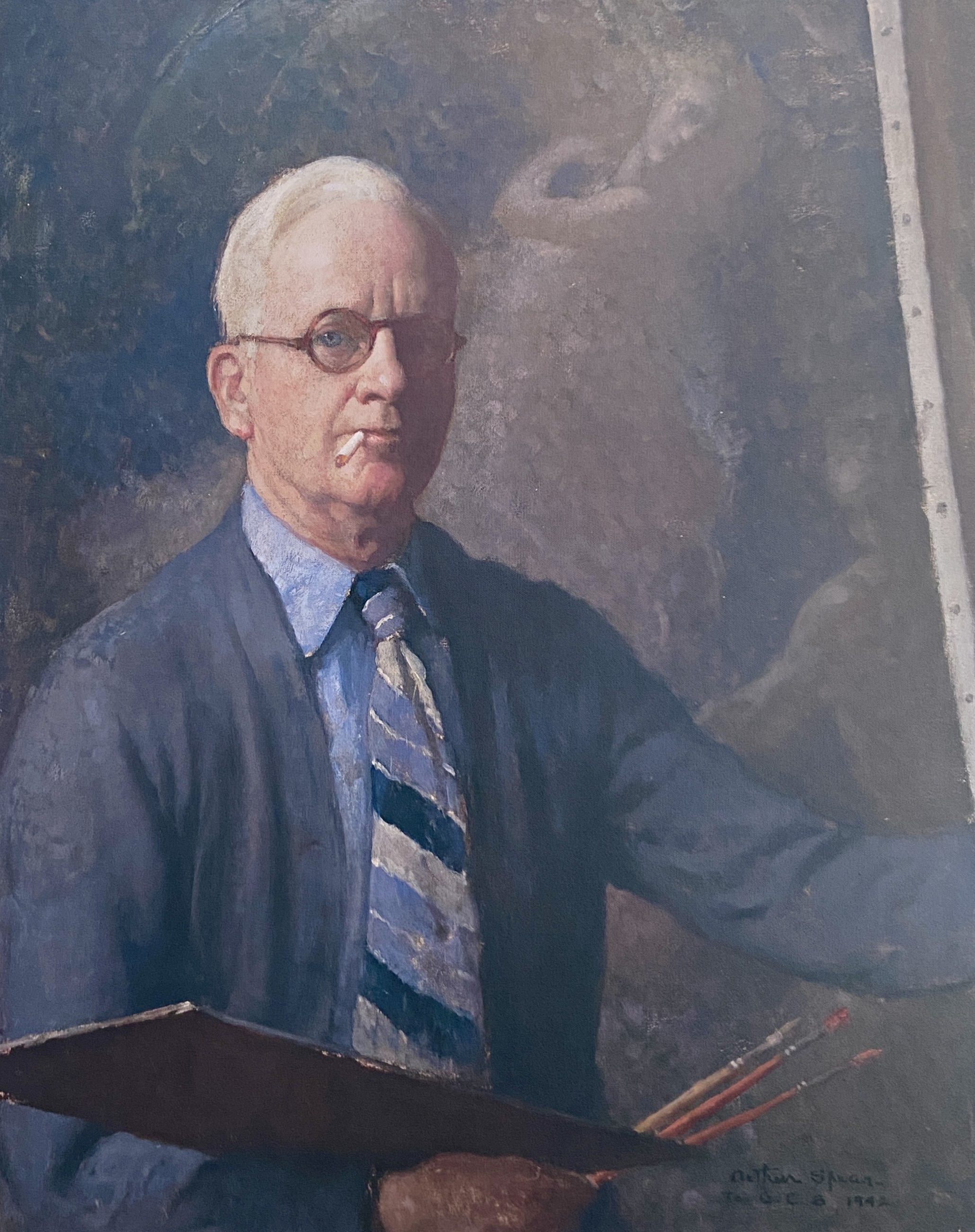
- In the Studio, c. 1942
- Born: September 23, 1879; Washington, D.C.
- Died: July 6, 1959; Waban, Massachusetts
- Education: George Washington University, Art Students League of New York, Académie Julian

Arthur Prince Spear (1879–1959) was an American painter best known for his fantastical paintings of nymphs, fauns, and under-sea dwellers.

== Life ==
He was born on September 23, 1879, in Washington, D.C. to Sarah and Ellis Spear.

Spear briefly attended the Columbian College of Arts and Sciences at George Washington University but left after a year to focus on painting. From 1899 to 1902, he attended the Art Students League of New York. While a student, Spear became close friends with fellow artists Arthur Crisp and Harry Hoffman. In 1902, he moved to Paris to study at the Académie Julian, where he became a pupil of French artist Jean-Paul Laurens.

In 1905, Spear married Grace Chapman in Portland, Maine. After completing his studies in 1907, he moved back to Boston and taught life drawing at the Fenway School of Illustration. Spear maintained an art studio in Boston's Fenway Studios and a summer home in Friendship, Maine.

== Career ==
Spear was experimental with his art, changing subject matter and style frequently. His works from 1907 to 1915 centered on Bostonian historical sites but shifted in 1915, when he produced several paintings of women in the American Impressionism style. Starting in 1917, Spear's style evolved to have bolder colors, imaginary scenery, and fanciful subjects ranging from mermaids to satyrs. Frequently, his children modeled for his paintings.

During the Great Depression, there was reduced demand for expensive art, so Spear made a number of lithographs of his previous paintings to supplement his income. Sometime after 1944, he stopped painting and destroyed much of his work. A retrospective of his work was held at The Guild of Boston Artists in 1951.

Spear belonged to The Guild of Boston Artists, the St. Botolph Club, the New York Watercolor Club, the Allied American Artists, and was an Associate of the National Academy of Design. He won a silver medal for Spring in the City in 1915 at the Panama–Pacific International Exposition in San Francisco. At the National Academy of Design, he won the Benjamin Altman Prize for Sunrise in 1921 and the Henry Ward Ranger Fund Purchase Prize for The Little Princess in 1924.

== Selection of Paintings ==
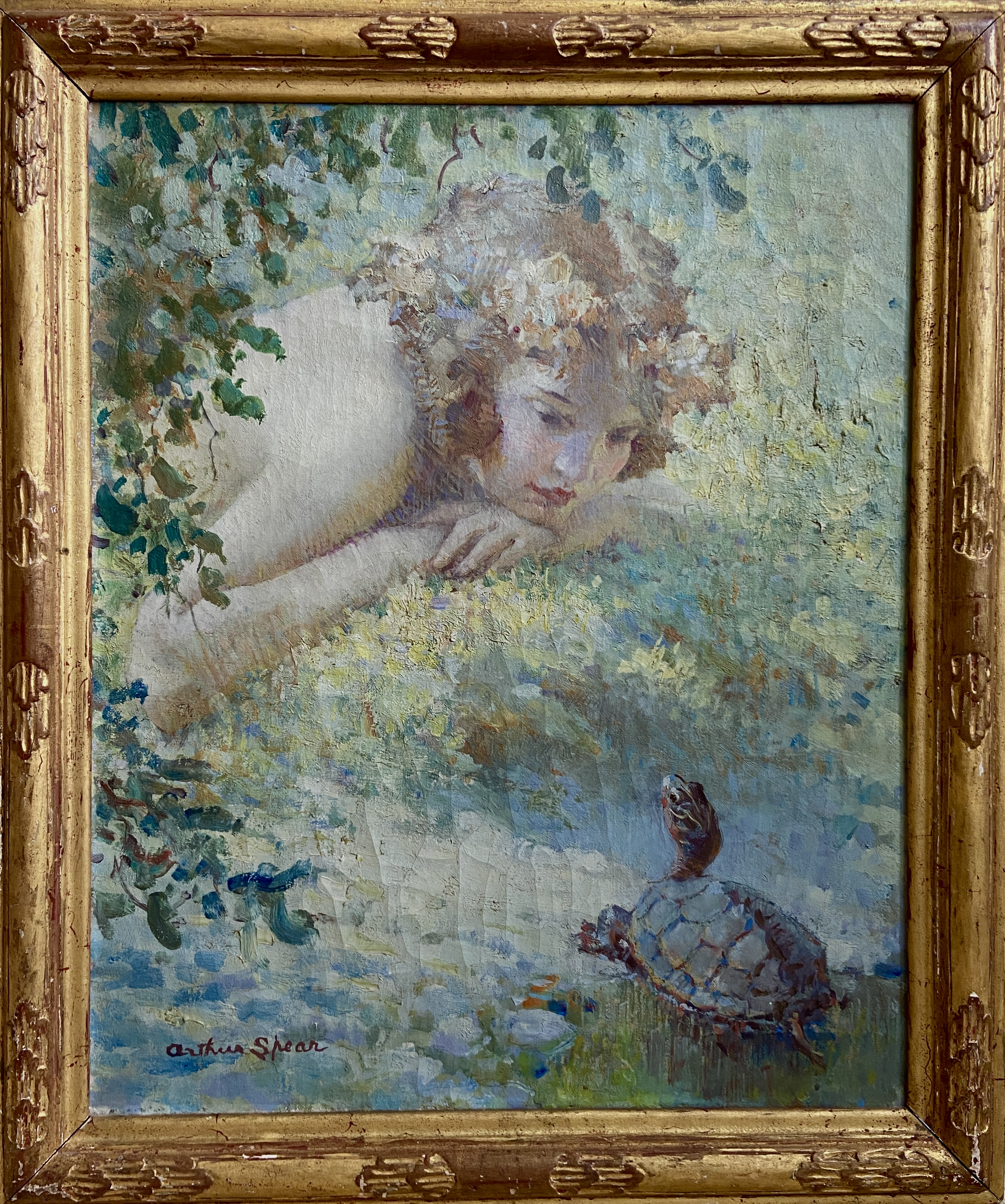
The Nymph and the Turtle, 1920

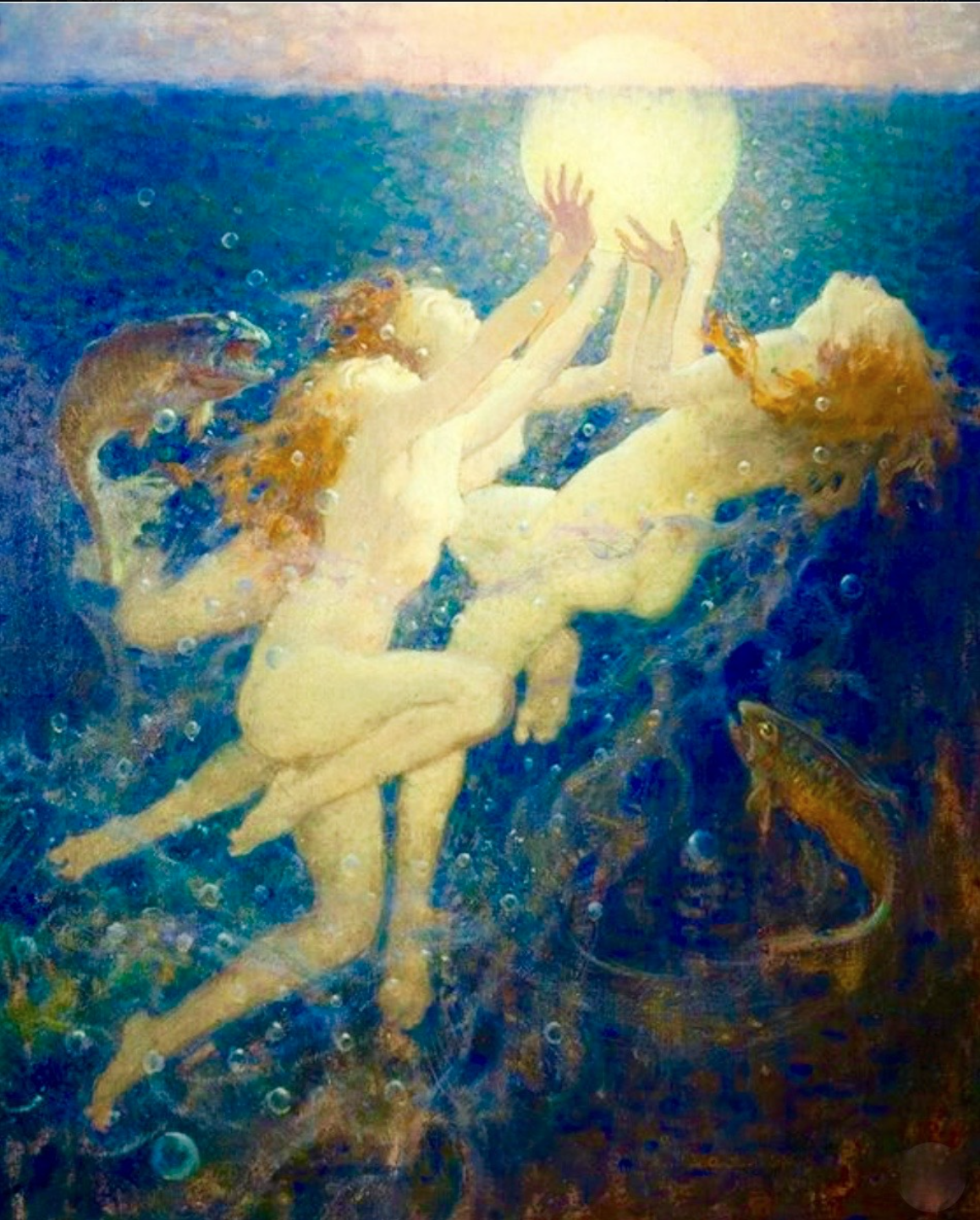
Sunrise, 1921

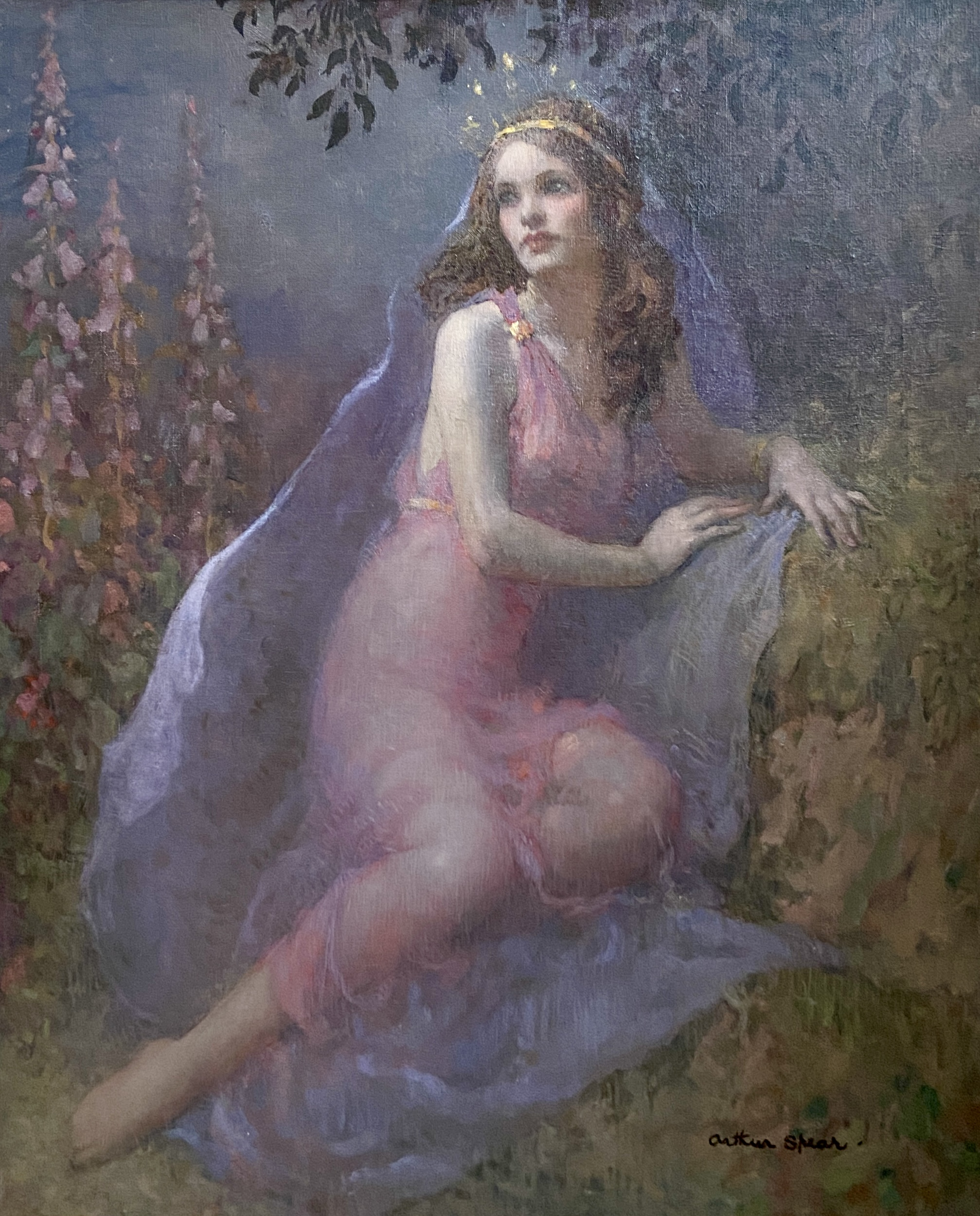
Titania, 1927

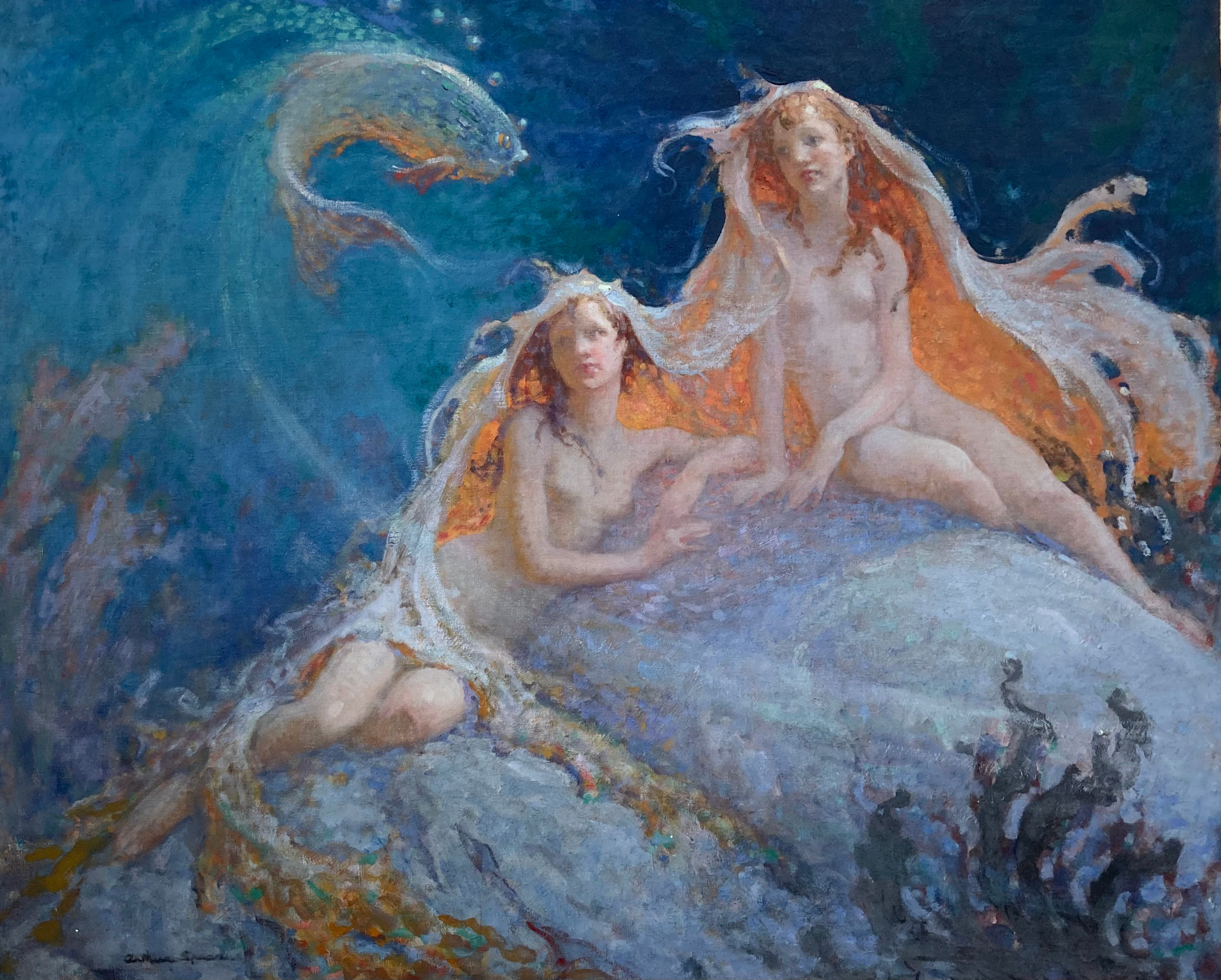
Sea Weeds, 1927
