= Abel J. Brown =

American Pastor

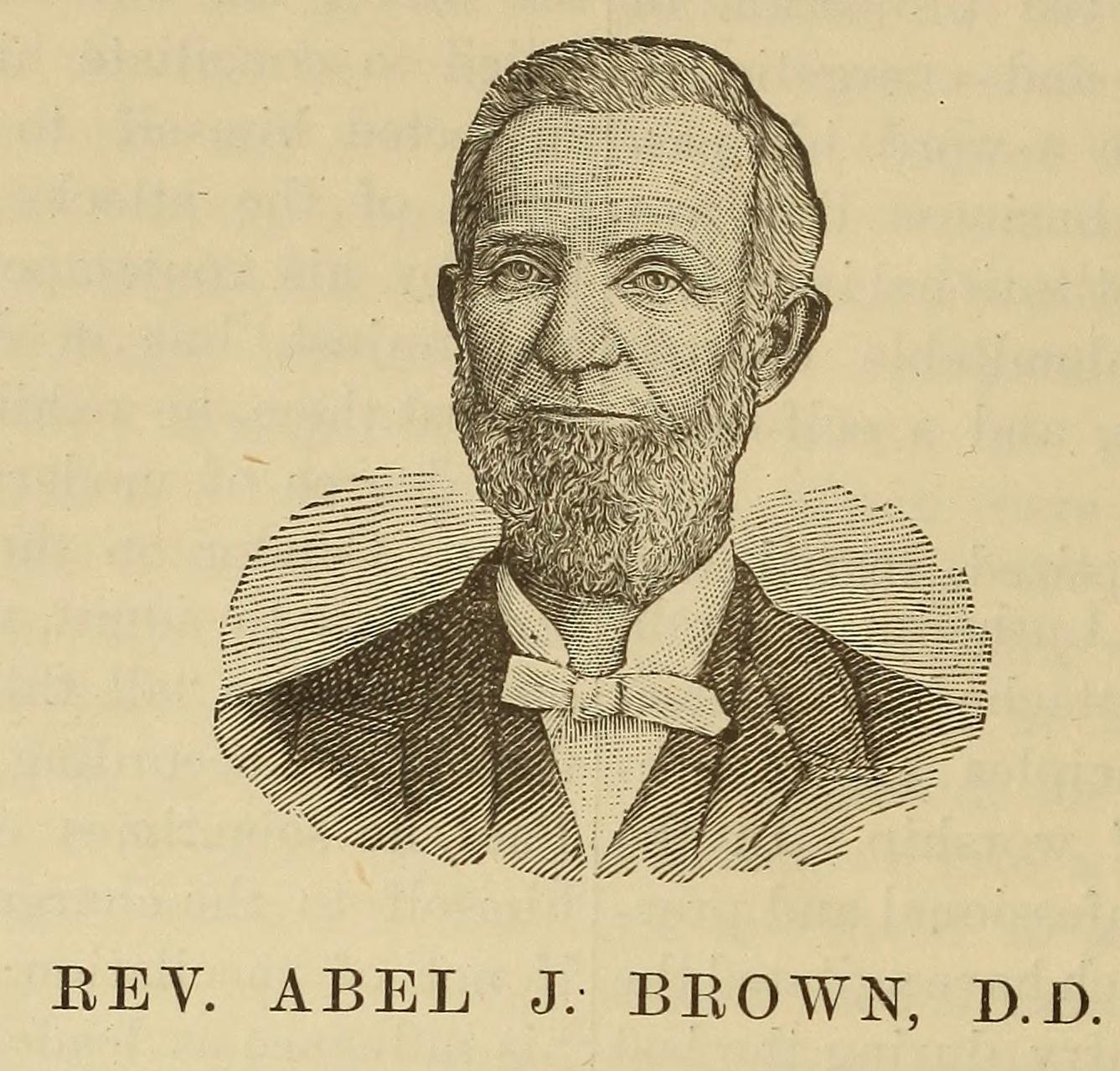
- Abel J. Brown from American Lutheran Biographies
- Born: March 17, 1817; Lincolnton, North Carolina
- Died: July 7, 1894 (aged 77); Sullivan County, Tennessee
- Education: Emory and Henry College
- Occupation: Minister
- Years active: 1836–1894
- Spouses: Julian Teeter (c. 1840); Emily Teeter (1842)
- Children: Charles Augustus Brown
- Parent(s): Absalom and Elizabeth (Killian) Brown
- Religion: Lutheran
- Ordained: 1836 (Deacon); 1837 (Pastor)
- Offices held: President and Secretary of Evangelical Lutheran Tennessee Synod; President of United Synod of the Evangelical Lutheran Church in the South

Abel J. Brown (1817–1894), was a Lutheran pastor of Immanuel's and Buehler's (or Beeler's) congregations in Sullivan County, Tennessee. He was a leader in the Evangelical Lutheran Tennessee Synod from 1836 to 1861. He was instrumental in the leading the East Tennessee congregations to form the Evangelical Lutheran Holston Synod, and was a leading member of that synod from 1861 until his death. He published several of his sermons and essays, and was the president of the Diet of Salisbury in 1884, which oversaw the creation of the United Synod of the Evangelical Lutheran Church in the South.

== Birth to ordination ==
Brown was born near Lincolnton, North Carolina, on March 27, 1817. He was the son of Absalom and Elizabeth (Killian) Brown, and the first son and second child of a family of ten children. His paternal grandfather was an Englishman who came to America when a boy and was a soldier in the Revolutionary war. His maternal grandfather was of German extraction, a native of Pennsylvania but in early life came to North Carolina, where he lived for the rest of his life.

Brown's parents and ancestors generally, so far as is known, belonged to the laboring classes, and were distinguished for their industry, their frugality and thrift, and their moral integrity and religious worth. His mother was a woman of strong mind and of deep religious convictions, and eminently pious. His father was a man of superior native intellect, and of great firmness and decision and character. He was a farmer and mechanic and carefully trained up his children to manual labor, as well as "in the nurture and admonition of the Lord", He was a man of considerable prominence in the community in which he lived. For many years he held the office of magistrate, and was often solicited to run for higher offices, but always positively declined.

Brown's primary education was received in a good country school. His academic studies, preparatory to entering college, were prosecuted principally in the Male Academy at Lincolnton, North Carolina, and his collegiate course was taken in Emory and Henry College in Virginia, from which he was graduated with a Bachelor of Arts degree. The college later conferred up on him the Master of Arts degree, not merely "in course", but because of his higher attainments in literature.

After graduation Brown engaged for a time in teaching. He first took charge of Jefferson Male Academy in Blountville, Tennessee, which he held for five or six years until he accepted a professorship in Greenville College in Tennessee. At the end of two years he resigned his position in this institution and took charge of the academic department of Jefferson Male Academy, which, in the meantime, had been rebuilt and enlarged, and had had the sphere of its operations and usefulness greatly enlarged and otherwise improved. He held this position until the outbreak of the American Civil War. During this time he was offered a professorship in one college and the presidency of another, both of which he declined. He is regarded as an accomplished scholar and one of the best educators in the country.

He first married Julian Teeter, daughter of Jacob and Sophie (Speece) Teeters. However, she only lived one year into the marriage. After her death, he married her sister Emily Teeter in 1842. Their son, Charles Augustus Brown, was a lawyer, and his grandson, Joseph K. Brown, was a prominent attorney in Bristol, Tennessee.

== Ordination until death ==
In 1836, at age 19, Brown was ordained to the work or the ministry as a deacon in the Evangelical Lutheran Tennessee Synod and devoted his time and studies for six years exclusively to this work. In 1837, he was ordained as a pastor in the same body. He was elected secretary of the synod six times as recorded in the synod's minutes, and president in 1854 and 1858. His work during this time was principally in North Carolina, although he did a good deal of preaching in other states, particularly in South Carolina. While engaged in teaching, he preached regularly in the places of his location. His services were, however, for the most part, rendered gratuitously. In 1858, he took charge of Immanuel and Buehler's congregations in Sullivan County, Tennessee, which he retained until his death in 1894. He owned property directly to the east of John B. Hamilton's Farm, (which had been owned by the Snapp family) just west of Blountville.

Brown was voted president and secretary of the Tennessee Synod often at its conventions.

In 1861, he was instrumental in the organization of the Evangelical Lutheran Holston Synod of Tennessee, which separated from the Tennessee Synod due to difficulties in travel to synod conventions. He said in his 1886 discourse on the Holston Synod's founding,

"The withdrawal of East Tennessee Lutherans from the Tennessee Synod was not a step taken hastily or rashly, but after long and deliberate and prayerful reflection. Nor was it taken because of dissatisfaction with the doctrinal position of the Synod, or because of any personal difficulties with any of its members, or for the accomplishment of any selfish or sinister ends; but solely because it was believed that the best interests of the Lutheran Church in East Tennessee imperatively demanded the formation of an independent Synod within its limits. Amongst the reasons assigned by the petitioners for the step which they proposed, were the inconvenience and expensiveness of attending the annual conventions of the Synod when it met in another State, which was here years in every four; the loss to the people of whatever advantages might result from the meeting of the Synod in the midst of them annually, the slowness of the process by which any measure for the good of the Church could be introduced, because the Synod was scattered over so vast an extent of territory, that it was difficult to get as full a meeting of the Synod as was necessary for the adoption of any important measure; and because all business transacted by the Synod could be just as well transacted by the new Synod comtempleated, as could be in the Tennessee Synod."

Brown served as a strong leader in the Holston Synod as much as he had in the Tennessee Synod, if not more so. The actual ratification of the Holston Synod occurred in his congregation, Immanuel, in 1865. Brown pushed for education in the Holston Synod, however because of financial hard times the Holston Synodical College was a short lived venture. Brown served several terms as president and secretary of the Synod.

In former years Brown took a very prominent and active part in the controversies which then agitated the Southern Lutheran Church. His "A Vindication of the Evangelical Tennessee Synod" in 1838 was a response to a sermon of Rev. John Bachman. While still young, he wrote articles for the Lutheran Observer on the Lord's Supper. The views he expressed were criticized by its editor, Dr. Kurtz.

Through his life he wrote much for the Lutheran Observer, the Lutheran Standard, Our Church Paper (from Henkel Press, a southern Lutheran publisher), and literary magazines, besides publishing sermons and essays in separate form. Twice he was elected president of North Carolina college, but declined. He also declined editorship of the Lutheran Standard in Ohio. In later years he was a regular contributor to the Lutheran, the Lutheran Home, and wrote one article for the Lutheran Quarterly. In consideration of his literary and theological attainments, Roanoke College, in 1873, conferred upon him the degree of Doctor of Divinity. In 1876 and 1877 he served as the Holston Synod's representative at the meeting of the Lutheran General Council. Charles Porterfield Krauth of the General Council would later describe Brown as the leading proponent for historic Lutheranism in the South.

In 1884, Brown took a leading part in the formation of the United Synod of the Evangelical Lutheran Church in the South and was president of the Diet of Salisbury at which it was formed. He then served as president of the new synod. In this union he saw Southern Lutheranism as accepting the Lutheran identity he has fought for as a young man.

In 1886, the 50th anniversary of his ordination (as a deacon, not his pastoral ordination), eight years before his death, the synod presented him with a parchment containing the following:

"To Our Senior Pastor and President of the Evangelical Lutheran Holston Synod the Rev. Abel J. Brown, Doctor of Divinity
At the Fiftieth Anniversary of his Ordination to the Holy Office of the Gospel Ministry, and the Twenty-Fifth Annual Convention of our Synod, which he helped to organize and of which he has ever been a faithful and zealous member, we his brethren and friends present this token of our affection and esteem, praying God and our Lord Jesus Christ for His richest blessing upon him. Given this fourteenth day of August, 1886, at Immanuel Church, Sullivan County, Tennessee. – The Synod."

Until his last days, he was still actively engaged in the ministry, and preached every Sunday with as much ease as ever. On July 17, 1894, he was preaching "Nightless Day in the Home of the Blest" for a funeral at Buehler's Church. He suddenly collapsed and died shortly afterwards. He is buried in Blountville, Tennessee.

== Published works ==
- Synodical sermon : the perfection of God's plan of human Salvation (New Market [Virginia] : Henkel, [1893])
- Portraiture of Lutheranism in its fundamental principles : and some of its distinctive doctrinal features : sermon, preached at the dedication of St. Mary's Lutheran Church, Monroe County, Tenn., October 26, 1879 (Bristol, Tenn. : Printed at the "Daily Argus" Office, 1880).
- Nightless day in the home of the blest : sermon, partly delivered in Weaver's Church, Sullivan County, Tennessee, Sunday morning, June 3, 1894 (New Market [Virginia] : Henkel, 1894).
- The Lutheran Church built on the only true foundation sermon (Philadelphia : Lutheran Book Store, [1870?])
- The importance of divine truth in its integrity and purity
- The divine formula for the administration of the Lord's Supper : sermon, delivered in Immanuel and Buehler's Churches, Sullivan County, Tennessee, in April, 1883 (Bristol [Tenn.] : J.L. King, 1883).
- The conflict and the crown : together with a tribute of respect to the late Rev. Alfred J. Fox, M.D., delivered at Salem Church, Cocke County, Tennessee, June 7, 1885 (Philadelphia : Lutheran Publication Society, 1885).
- The Christian minister delineated and moral influence exerted after death : sermon occasioned by the death of Rev. Adam Miller, Sen., delivered at Poor Valley and Zion's Churches, Washington Co., Virginia, August, 1844 (Knoxville : Brownlow & Haws, 1867).
- A vindication of the Evangelical Lutheran Tennessee Synod, on the Doctrine and Discipline of the Evangelical Lutheran Church (Salem, [Tenn.?]: Blum & Son, 1838) in rare books at University of Tennessee.
- Numerous letters to the editor and opinion pieces in Our Church Paper, a Lutheran weekly publication from the Henkel Press in New Market, VA, which ran from 1873 to 1904 when it merged with The Lutheran Visitor to become the Lutheran Church Visitor.

== Bibliography ==
Several sentences above are extracted verbatim from these works

- J. C. Jensson. American Lutheran Biographies (Milwaukee: A. Houtkamp & Son, 1890) pp. 114–15.
- Lutheran Cyclopedia (St. Louis: Concordia Pub. House, 1975) under "Brown, Abel J."
- C.W. Cassell, W. J. Finck, and Elon O. Henkel, eds. History of the Lutheran Church in Virginia and East Tennessee (Strasburg VA: Shenandoah Publishing House, 1930).
- Life Sketches of Lutheran Ministers: North Carolina and Tennessee Synods 1773-1965, North Carolina Synod of the Lutheran Church in America, 1966, p. 30
- Our Church Paper (New Market, Shenandoah County, Va: Henkel & Calvert, 1873–1904). Weekly newspaper for Lutherans in the Southeast, containing many editorials and sermons by Brown.
- Oliver Taylor. Historic Sullivan; A History of Sullivan County, Tennessee, with Brief Biographies of the Makers of History (Bristol, Tenn: King Print. Co, 1909) under "Abel J. Brown" in Biographies section.
- Goodspeed's History of Sullivan County
- The Sullivan County Historical Commission and Associates. Historic Sites of Sullivan County.. Compiled by Mrs. Muriel C. Spoon (Kingsport 1976), pp. 21, 116–17, 133, 142, 225.
- Minutes of the Lutheran General Council, 1874–1886.
