= Special Program for Embassy Augmentation and Response =

Antiterrorism and policing force

The Special Program for Embassy Augmentation and Response (SPEAR) is an antiterrorism and policing force in select regions around the world, designed to respond to crises and threats to US diplomats as well as US embassies and diplomatic missions. Law enforcement personnel from host nations are chosen to be members of SPEAR and are trained by the Diplomatic Security Service's (DSS) Office of Antiterrorism and Assistance (ATA). SPEAR was established in 2014 in the aftermath of the 2012 Benghazi attack, in nations where the ability to protect high risk U.S. personnel and property were weak. Since its inception, SPEAR personnel have by mid-2021 provided extra security for more than 500 diplomatic affairs.

== Funding ==
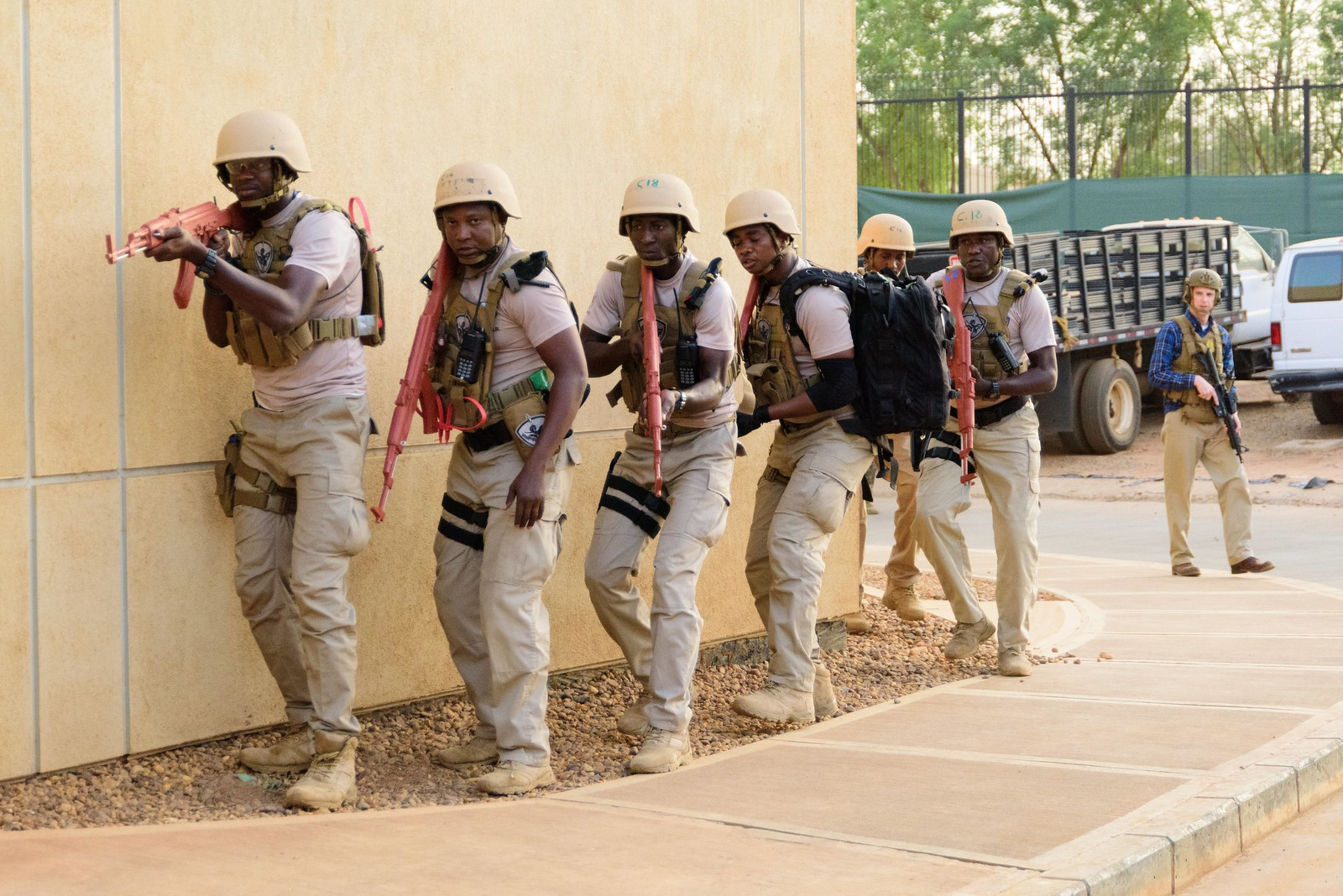
SPEAR training exercise on April 12th, 2016

SPEAR is funded by the ATA, and as of 2019 SPEAR has received approximately 33.7 million dollars.

== Participating nations ==
- Burkina Faso
- Central African Republic
- Chad
- Democratic Republic of Congo
- Iraq
- Kenya
- Mali
- Mauritania
- Niger
- Nigeria
- South Sudan
- Tunisia

== Training ==
By mid-2021, SPEAR has trained over 400 law enforcement officers in participating SPEAR Nations. SPEAR teams work with the US embassy to conduct joint readiness exercises with embassy forces as well as the US marine security guards. SPEAR also holds annual Summit's in which participating nations will send their SPEAR team to take part in joint training and competitions. It held its first summit in 2018.

=== 2018 Summit ===
The inaugural SPEAR Summit challenge was held in Nairobi, Kenya from December 10–14, 2018. SPEAR teams from Mali, Tunisia, Niger, and Kenya participated alongside a Kenyan National Police response unit as well as a team from the U.S. Embassy's Regional Service Office. The training consisted of firearm proficiency, field medicine, personnel fitness, IED identification and response, and personnel recovery and evacuation.

=== 2019 Summit ===
The 2019 SPEAR Summit was a five-day conference held in Thiés, Senegal from December 2–6, 2019. SPEAR teams from Burkina Faso, Chad, Kenya, Mali, Niger, Tunisia, and South Sudan participated, alongside Senegalese law enforcement teams. The training and competition covered field medicine, firing and range familiarization, IED identification and response, teamwork obstacle courses, and evacuating personnel. At the end of the conference, team Tunisia was declared the winner of the 2019 SPEAR Summit Challenge.

== Deployments ==
=== Kenya ===
On January 19, 2019, a SPEAR team was deployed in response to the Dusit2 complex attack in Nairobi. In the process of clearing the complex and rescuing civilians, the SPEAR team fought and killed two out of the five terrorists directing the attack. Two SPEAR members were seriously injured from a grenade explosion, but a third member was able to administer first aid to the wounded and they were later evacuated from the site. The terrorist attack conducted by Al-Shabaab killed 21 civilians with security services escorting more than 700 people out of the complex. Just a month prior to the attack, Kenyan counterterrorism forces and Kenyan SPEAR collaborated with the US Regional Security Office to exercise real time attack scenarios similar to the attack at the Dusit. The Kenyan SPEAR team consists of officers from the General Service Unit (GSU), which is a specialized military group within the Kenyan police service.

=== Mali ===
The SPEAR team in Mali is frequently deployed to escort and provide protection to the US Ambassador during his diplomatic missions outside of the nations capital of Bamako.

=== Nigeria ===
Nigeria's SPEAR team received praise from the DSS for their work in protecting US diplomats during Nigerian protests in October 2020. The team based in Lagos, had much of their success attributed to their primary backgrounds as local police officers, as their "familiarity with local conditions, customs, and laws makes them highly effective at de-escalating potential security situations between consulate personnel, the local population, or other security services." The Nigerian SPEAR team is the only SPEAR team to have a naval part, as they have two boats which they use as urban transport. Its 47 members are recruited from the Nigerian Mobile Police (MOPOL) including an American mentor.

== Shortcomings ==
In a report released by the US State Department Inspector General it outlined several problems with parts of the program. It stated that some SPEAR units failed to properly inventory equipment and lost track of dozens of vehicles that were loaned to them from the State department. The report also pointed out that some of the SPEAR mentors who were US contractors were behaving too much like US government officials, which is a breach of code. Its most scathing complaint however was about the SPEAR team in Mauritania. Based in the capital city of Nouakchott, this SPEAR team had 3.6 million dollars invested in it, but was grossly underperforming to the point where the report recommended terminating the SPEAR program there. The report found that there was no process in place to terminate a SPEAR program, but processes have been put in place and actions have been taken to disband the SPEAR program in Mauritania.
