= Justice Spear =

Justice Spear may refer to:

- Albert Spear (1852–1929), chief justice of the Maine Supreme Judicial Court
- Clay V. Spear (c. 1914–1974), associate justice of the Idaho Supreme Court
- William T. Spear (1834–1913), associate justice of the Ohio Supreme Court

== See also ==
- Franklin S. Spears (1931–1996), justice of the Texas Supreme Court
- Spear of Justice, a track from the Undertale Soundtrack.
