= Marcus Spears =

Marcus Spears may refer to:

- Marcus Spears (offensive tackle) (born 1971), American football player in NFL, 1992–2004 (Chicago Bears, Kansas City Chiefs)
- Marcus Spears (defensive end) (born 1983), American football player in NFL, 2005–2013 (Dallas Cowboys, Baltimore Ravens)
