= John Murray Spear =

American Spiritualist minister (1804–1887)

John Murray Spear (September 16, 1804 – October 5, 1887) was an American spiritualist minister who was most known for his attempts to construct an electrically powered Messiah which he referred to as the "New Motive Power".

== Early life ==
Spear was born in the city of Boston in 1804 and was from a young age a member of the Universalist Church of America. The pastor of this church was Hosea Ballou, under whom Spear and his brother, Charles, studied theology. In 1830, Spear was ordained and became minister of the Barnstable congregation. He later became a close colleague of Theodore Parker and William Lloyd Garrison. In the 1840s, Spear was active in petitioning for social reform including women's rights, labor reform, and the removal of the death penalty. Also a prominent abolitionist, Spear organized the first Universalist antislavery convention and helped to oversee the stretch of the Underground Railroad which ran through Boston. Spear ran a prison reform newspaper, The Prisoner's Friend, with his brother Charles.

== Constructing the New Motive Power ==
In 1852, Spear broke all ties with the Universalist church and instead turned to Spiritualism. He claimed that he was in contact with "The Association of Electrizers", a group of spirits including Benjamin Franklin, Thomas Jefferson, John Quincy Adams, and Benjamin Rush, as well as Spear's namesake John Murray. Evidence indicates he occasionally faked signatures as a way to gain authority from a "guide from the past"; however, these signatures were dated beyond the lifetimes of the deceased. Spear believed that the purpose of this group was to bring new technology to people so that greater levels of personal and spiritual freedom could be achieved. The following year, Spear and a handful of followers retreated to a wooden shed at the top of High Rock Hill in Lynn, Massachusetts, where they set to work creating the "New Motive Power", a messianic perpetual motion machine. Spear compared the machine to Jesus Christ, which was intended to power the world with supernatural energies and herald a new era of Utopia. The New Motive Power was constructed of copper, zinc, and magnets, all carefully machined, as well as a dining room table. At the end of nine months, Spear and the "New Mary", an unnamed woman, ritualistically birthed the contraption in an attempt to give it life. This failed to have the desired effect, and the machine was later destroyed by hostile Christian neighbors in rural upstate New York.

== Later life and death ==
Spiritualism influenced Spear throughout most of his life. His business card notes, "Guided and assisted by beneficent Spirit-Intelligences, Mr. S. will examine and prescribe for disease of body and mind, will delineate the character of persons when present, or by letter, and indicate their future as impressions are given him; will sketch the special capacities of young persons ... Applications to lecture, or hold conversations on Spiritualism, will be welcomed."

In 1872, Spear claimed to have received a message from the Association of Electrizers urging him to retire from the ministry. He died in October 1887, in the city of Philadelphia, and was buried in the Mount Moriah Cemetery.

== See also ==
- Frankenstein
- Giovanni Aldini
- Johann Konrad Dippel
