= Spears (surname) =

Spears is an English surname. Notable people with the surname include:

- Aries Spears (born 1975), American actor and comedian
- Billie Jo Spears (1938–2011), American country singer
- Britney Spears (born 1981), American pop singer
- Brittany Spears (born 1988), American basketball player
- Dashawn Spears (McBryde), (born 2006), American football player
- Frank Sydney Spears (1906–1991), South African artist and designer
- Jamie Lynn Spears (born 1991), American actress, singer, and younger sister of Britney Spears
- Ken Spears (1938–2020), American animator, writer, television producer and sound editor
- Kendra Spears (born 1988), American fashion model
- Lynne Spears (born 1955), mother of Britney and Jamie Lynn Spears
- Edward Spears, Bt, KBE (1886–1974), British army officer, MP and author
- Marcel Spears Jr. (born 1997), American football player
- Marcus Spears, multiple people
- Monroe K. Spears (1916–1998), American university professor
- Randy Spears (born 1961), American former pornographic actor
- Rick Spears, American comics writer
- Robert Spears-Jennings (born 2004), American football player
- Shawn Spears (born 1981), Canadian professional wrestler born Ronnie Arneill and also known as Gavin Spears
- Tony Spears (born 1965), British rugby league footballer who played in the 1980s
- Tyjae Spears (born 2001), American football player
- Warren Spears (1954–2005), American dancer and choreographer

== See also ==
- Speers (disambiguation)
- Spear (surname)
