= Speare =

Speare is a surname, a variant form of Spear also deriving from Middle and Old English spere ("spear"), variously intending a spearman, a spearmaker, or a person considered tall and thin in a manner reminiscent of a spear.

Notable people with the surname include:

- Elizabeth George Speare (1908–1994), American children's author
- Frank Palmer Speare (1869–1954), the first president of Northeastern University
- Jamie Speare (born 1976), English footballer playing as a goalkeeper
- Paul Speare (born 1955), former member of Dexys Midnight Runners, The TKO Horns and The Expresso Bongo Orchestra
- Sally Speare Lutyens (1927–2005), composer, author, and librettist
- William Collins Speare (1915-1999), Canadian politician

== See also ==
- Jack Speare Park
- Spear (surname) and Shakespeare (surname)
- Sphere (disambiguation)
