= Shakeshaft =

Shakeshaft is a surname. Notable people with the surname include:

- Charol Shakeshaft, American education scholar
- Jenny Shakeshaft (born 1984), American actress and model
