= Spears House =

Spears House may refer to:

- Spears House (Greenbrier, Arkansas), listed on the NRHP in Arkansas
- Spears-Craig House, Danville, Kentucky, listed on the NRHP in Kentucky
- Jacob Spears Distillery, Shawhan, Kentucky, listed on the NRHP in Kentucky
- Jacob Spears House, Shawhan, Kentucky, listed on the NRHP in Kentucky
- Spears House (Concord, North Carolina), listed on the NRHP in North Carolina
