= Periodic deposit =

A periodic deposit is an investment made in the form of equal deposits over a regular time period. Each deposit recurs after a time interval. Such an investment is made to achieve a pre-planned financial objective and/or when the available capital to invest is limited.

In simpler words, periodic deposit is a deposit recurring on a periodic basis. Investments are made over the period, grow over the period and mature at the end of the period.

== Real world example ==
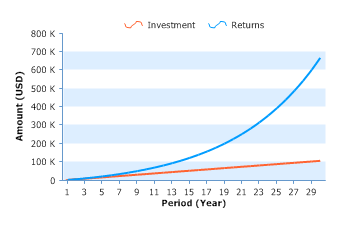
Periodic deposit performance chart based on real world example

John is planning investments for his retirement. He has decided to invest an amount of US$150.00 per pay check over a period of 30 years. He receives his pay check twice every month. The interest rate expected is 10% per annum with quarterly compounding.

Investment

Starting amount	Deposit mode	Periodic amount	Period	Interest rate	Compounding
US$0.00	Semi-monthly	US$150.00	30 year	10%	Quarterly

*All deposits made at start of the period

Returns

Invested amount	Interest accrued	Maturity amount	Gain
US$108,000.00	US$562,498.37	US$670,498.37	520.83%

== Calculation ==
The future value of a periodic deposit depends on the deposit amount, the number of deposits, the interest rate, the compounding frequency, and whether deposits are made at the beginning or end of each period. Investor education materials commonly describe this growth through compound interest, where interest is earned both on the original amount saved and on previously earned interest.

Periodic deposits are commonly used in savings-goal calculations because the investor contributes a regular amount over time instead of investing only one initial lump sum. The U.S. Securities and Exchange Commission's Investor.gov savings tools, for example, allow users to calculate how much must be contributed each month to reach a target amount, while its compound interest calculator includes recurring monthly contributions as part of the calculation.

== See also ==
- Finance
- Interest
- Rate of return on investment
- Real interest rate
- Single deposit
