= Nicole Speirs =

American murder victim (1983–2006)

Nicole Speirs

Nicole Marie Speirs (November 3, 1983 – March 25, 2006) made headlines in the area of Tooele, Utah as a domestic violence murder victim. She was killed March 25, 2006 at age 22, by her then-boyfriend and father of her twins, Walter Smith. On the night of Nicole's death, Smith reported that he found her dead in her home, drowned in her bathtub, after returning from a trip to Idaho. The autopsy confirmed that drowning was the cause of death. Tooele is located approximately 18 miles west of Salt Lake City.

The pair met during the summer of 2004, and went on to have a relationship. Later Nicole gave birth to a twin boy and girl.

Smith, her 24-year-old boyfriend and a member of the United States Marines who had returned from Iraq, was not immediately known to have killed her until December 12, 2006, when he confessed to the killing. According to police, Smith walked into a Veteran's Administration hospital building and confessed eight months after the fact. Smith was since discharged from the Marines.

As it was later revealed that Walter suffered from PTSD (Post-traumatic stress disorder) because of the six months he served in the Iraq War.

Walter could not explain why he murdered her. The detectives on the case suspected that the true motive behind the murder was that Nicole wanted to get married.

On August 14, 2007, Smith pleaded guilty to a second-degree manslaughter charge as part of a plea bargain. He was originally charged with first-degree felony murder.

Smith and Nicole's parents agreed to a plea bargain. He was sentenced 1–15 years for 2nd degree manslaughter on October 9, 2007.

The case was covered by Investigation Discovery show Unraveled, an episode called Deadly Demons (S01E05).

== Additional references ==
- Discovery ID, Unraveled, Deadly Demons
- America Reframed, Reserved To Fight, 2014
- New York Times, Deborah Sontag, An Iraq Veteran's Descent; A Prosecutor's Choice, January 20, 2008
- Tooele Transcript Bulletin, Mary Ruth Hammond, Boyfriend accused of killing young mother, December 4, 2006
- KSL News, Sam Penrod, Man Admits to Taking Part in Girlfriend's Death, December 12, 2006
- KUTV.com, Police Say Man Confessed to Girlfriend's Death, December 12, 2006
- Nicole Speirs' MySpace and Yahoo profiles
- Section of Bonnie's Blog of Crime – tracking media coverage of Speirs murder
- KSL news, Sam Penrod, Man Accused of Murdering His Girlfriend Deemed Competent to Stand Trial, June 5, 2007
