= Speir =

To speir in Scots means to ask about something or enquire about something. As in "He cam in to speir aboot whether or nae we ettled tae gang tae the pairtie.'

Speir may refer to:

- Dona Speir (born 1964), American model
- H. C. Speir (1895-1972), American record store owner
- Rupert Speir (1910-1998), British Conservative Party politician

== See also ==
- Spear (disambiguation)
- Speer
- Speirs (disambiguation)
