= Duston Spear =

American artist

Duston Spear is an American artist.

She received a certificate from Parsons School of Design in 1976, a B.A. from New York University in 1989, and an M.A. from New York University in 1998. She served as a Falk Visiting Artist in the Department of Art at The University of North Carolina at Greensboro in the spring of 1996. Beginning in spring of 2002, she began work as an adjunct professor of fine arts at Pace University. Starting in spring of the following year, she began work as an adjunct professor for Higher Education for Women in Prison. She has taught painting at Bedford Hills Correctional Facility in Bedford Hills, NY. Her work has been shown at the Metropolitan Museum, the Brooklyn Museum, and the High Museum of Art, among others.

A native of Virginia, she resides in New York City. She is represented by Sara Tecchia Roma New York in Chelsea.

== Additional references ==
- Duston Spear Homepage
- Finding Aid for the Duston Spear Collection at The University of North Carolina at Greensboro
- Gallery Homepage
