= Speer =

Speer is a surname of various origins:

•Middle High German and Middle Dutch (pronounced [ˈspeːr]): sper, meaning "spear"

•Ashkenazi Jewish (pronounced [ˈʃpɛr]): a spelling variation of Speyer, a name indicative of origin from the German city of Speyer (more at Shapiro).

• Scottish and northern Irish /ˈspɪər/: a spelling variation of Speir, from the Old French espier meaning "to watch"

Notable people with the surname include:

- Albert Friedrich Speer, (1863–1947), German architect, father of Albert Speer
- Albert Speer, (1905–1981), German architect, Minister of Armaments and War Production of Nazi Germany from 1942 to 1945
- Albert Speer (born 1934), (1934–2017), a German architect and city planner, son of Albert Speer
- Bill Speer, a retired professional ice hockey player
- Christian P. Speer, (born 1952) German pediatrician and Professor of Pediatrics
- Christopher Speer, Sergeant First Class (SFC), a U.S. special forces soldier killed in Afghanistan
- Del Speer (born 1970), American football player
- Dieter Speer, a former German biathlete
- Dick Speer, founder of CCI, brother of Vernon Speer
- Emory Speer, a U.S. politician, soldier, and lawyer who served in the U.S. House of Representatives from 1878 to 1882
- Floyd Speer, also known as Floyd Vernie Speer, a U.S. professional baseball pitcher
- Daniel Speer, also known as Georg Daniel Speer, a German composer, and writer of the Baroque
- Hilde Schramm (born 1936), née Speer, a German politician, and daughter of Albert Speer
- Hugo Speer, an English actor, born in 1968
- Jack Speer, also known as John “Jack” Bristol Speer, a judge, Washington state representative, and a science fiction fan
- James Gamble Speer, state legislator in Florida
- Jillian Speer, a U.S. singer-songwriter and musician
- Margret Nissen (born 1938), née Speer, a German photographer, and daughter of Albert Speer
- Mark Speer, American musician and guitarist
- Mary Margaret Speer, American mathematician
- Noah Wyle, also known as Noah Strausser Speer Wyle, a U.S. TV, and film actor
- Peter Moore Speer, a Republican member of the U.S. House of Representatives from Pennsylvania
- Robert Elliott Speer, a U.S. religious leader (1867–1947) and authority on missions
- Robert M. Speer, acting United States Secretary of the Army (2017- )
- Robert Milton Speer, a Democratic member of the U.S. House of Representatives from Pennsylvania
- Robert W. Speer, also known as Robert Walter Speer, mayor of Denver, Colorado from 1904–1912
- Roy Speer, the financial backing behind the Home Shopping Network
- Scott Speer, an American music video director
- The Speer Family, a Southern Gospel family group founded in 1921
- Stewie Speer, an Australian drummer best known as a member of the 1960s–70s group Max Merritt & The Meteors
- Susan Speer, a British psychologist
- Thomas J. Speer, also known as Thomas Jefferson Speer, a U.S. Representative from Georgia
- Thomas M Speers, First Chief of Police of Kansas City, Missouri 1874–1895
- Tom Speer, a U.S. professional mixed martial artist
- Vernon Speer, founder of Speer Bullets, brother of Dick Speer
- W. G. Speer, the second head football coach for the Fort Hays State University Tigers in Hays, Kansas
- William Speer, a pioneer American Presbyterian missionary and pastor to the Chinese

== See also ==
- Spear (surname)
- Speir
- Speers
