= Steven J. Spear =

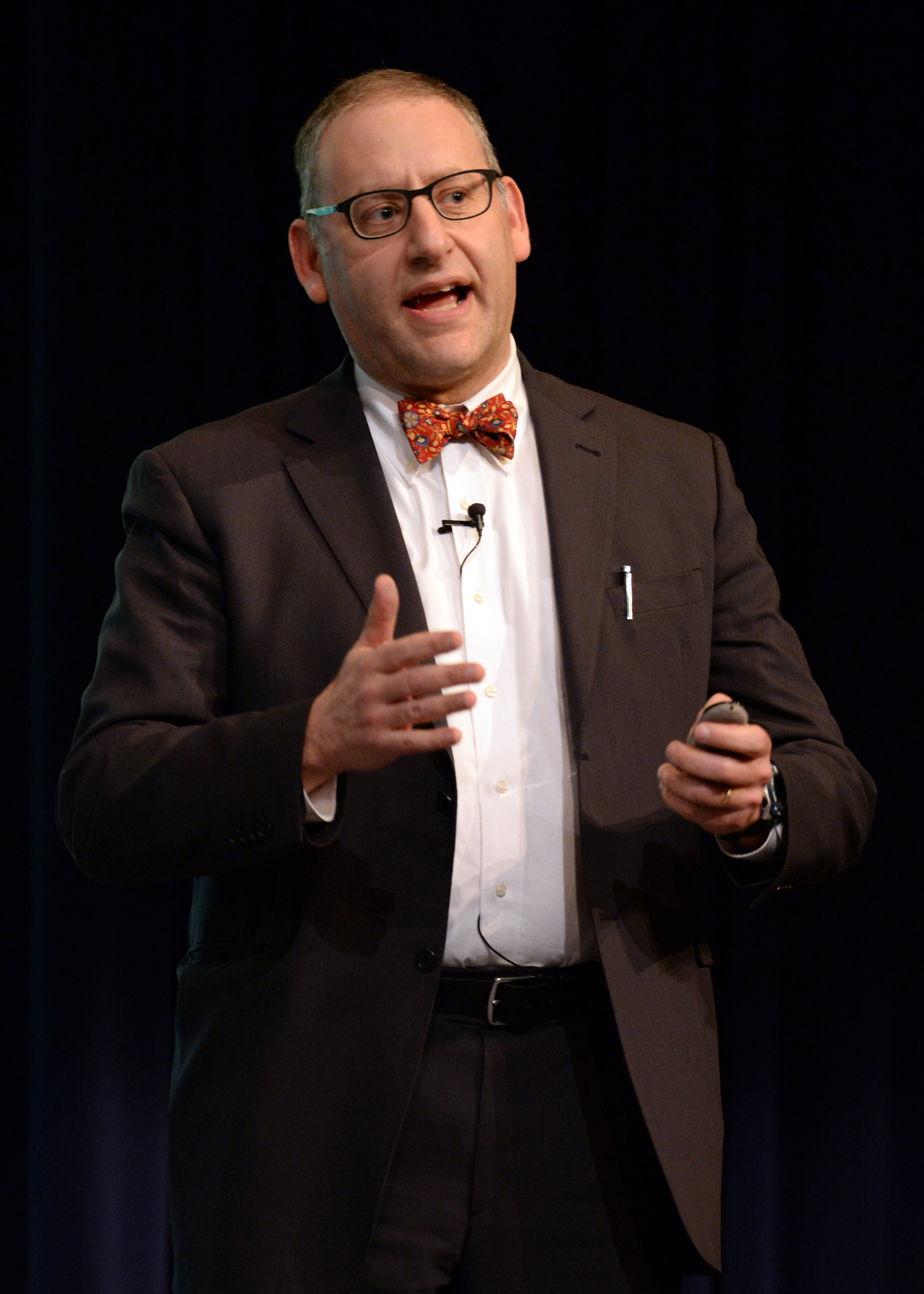
- Born: June 16, 1964 (age 62)

Academic background
- Education: Harvard Business School; Massachusetts Institute of Technology; Princeton University

Academic work
- Notable ideas: Decoding the DNA of Toyota Production System; The 4 Capabilities; Rules in Use
- Website: www.thehighvelocityedge.com

Steven J. Spear is a Senior Lecturer at MIT's Sloan School of Management and Senior Fellow at the Institute for Healthcare Improvement. As a Researcher and Author, he is the recipient of the McKinsey Award and five Shingo Prizes. His book, The High Velocity Edge, won both the Shingo Prize for Excellence in Manufacturing Research and Philip Crosby Medal from the American Society for Quality (ASQ).

His research and publications on "Decoding the DNA of the Toyota Product System" have been credited with "shaping the thinking, conversation and understanding for how organizations achieve and sustain high performance". The "4 Capabilities" and their underlying "Rules in Use" have influenced numerous Management Systems from Intel, Lockheed Martin, Intuit, Novelis, Alcoa, Memorial Sloan Kettering, Beth Israel Deaconess Medical Center, Pittsburgh Regional Healthcare Initiative, US Army's Rapid Equipping Force, US Navy, and DLA Distribution.

According to Clayton Christensen, the former Kim B. Clark Professor of Business Administration at the Harvard Business School (HBS): “I honestly think that history will judge Steve Spear’s doctoral thesis [on the Toyota Production System] to have been the finest, most impactful thesis ever written at the Harvard Business School, and that includes my own doctoral work on the phenomenon known as disruptive technology.”

== Early life and education ==
Steven J. Spear received his doctorate from Harvard Business School, a Master's in Engineering and in Management from Massachusetts Institute of Technology, and a Bachelor’s degree in Economics from Princeton. He credits much of his early success to Professor H. Kent Bowen of the Harvard Business School due to him helping open the door to pursue graduate studies at the doctoral level.

Another major influence on him was Hajime Ohba of Toyota, who allowed Spear to "learn from his experiences and the perspectives he had developed or when he coached me toward discoveries of my own." In addition, Professors Carliss Baldwin and Clayton Christensen "were constant with their inspiration and support". Carliss’ influence on Steve's "treatment of the structure of complex systems and Clay’s influence when I write about the dynamics of innovative competitors".

== Work ==
Steven J. Spear's work has been acknowledged with five Shingo Prizes and a McKinsey award from Harvard Business Review. His “Decoding the DNA of the Toyota Production System” and “Learning to Lead at Toyota” are part of the vocabulary for high performance organizations. His “Fixing Healthcare from the Inside, Today” and articles in Annals of Internal Medicine and Academic Medicine have been on the forefront in healthcare improvement. He's contributed to the Boston Globe and New York Times and has appeared on Bloomberg and CBS. He has influenced some of the largest organizations from Intel, Lockheed Martin, Intuit, Novelis, Alcoa, Memorial Sloan Kettering, and the Department of Defense.

His work is focused on two dimensions that separate "high velocity organizations" from their competition: structure and dynamics. As discussed above, these two dimensions were influenced by Carliss Baldwin and Clayton Christensen.

Paul H. O'Neill has described Spear's research as "contain(ing) ideas that form the basis for structured continuous learning and improvement in every aspect of our lives."

== Honors and awards ==
- 2011 Philip Crosby Medal from the American Society for Quality (ASQ) for The High Velocity Edge.
- 2009 Shingo Prize for Chasing the Rabbit.
- 2006 Shingo Prize for "Fixing Healthcare from the inside, Today.
- 2005 McKinsey Award for "Fixing Healthcare from the inside, Today".
- 2005 Shingo Prize for "Learning to Lead at Toyota".
- 2004 Shingo Prize for "The Essence of Just-In-Time: Embedding Diagnostic Tests in Work-Systems to Achieve Operational Excellence".
- 2000 Shingo Prize for "Decoding the DNA of the Toyota Production System".

== Bibliography ==
- The High Velocity Edge. Spear, Steven J. New York, NY: McGraw-Hill, 2010.
- "Fixing Healthcare from the Inside: Teaching Residents to Heal Broken Delivery Processes as they Heal Sick Patients." Spear, Steven J. Academic Medicine Vol. 81, No. 10 (2006): S144-S149.
- "Fast Discovery." Steven J. Spear. London, UK: January 2017.
- "Beyond the Jargon: Architecture, Process, and Clinical Care." McGuire, Kevin J., and Steven J. Spear. Spine Vol. 40, No. 16 (2015): 1243-1246.
- "Reinventing Healthcare Delivery." Steven J. Spear. London, UK: May 2012.
- "Using Real-Time Problem Solving to Eliminate Central Line Infections." Shannon, Richard P., Diane Frndak, Naida Grunden, Jon C. Lloyd, Cheryl Herbert, Bhavin Patel, Daniel Cummins, Alexander H. Shannon, Paul H. O’Neill, and Steven J. Spear. The Joint Commission Journal on Quality and Patient Safety Vol. 32, No. 9 (2006): 479-487.
- "Operational Failures and Interruptions in Hospital Nursing." Tucker, Anita L., and Steven J. Spear. Health Services Research Vol. 41, No. 3p1 (2006): 643-662.
- "The Health Factory." Spear, Steven J. The New York Times, August 29, 2005.
- "Ambiguity and Workarounds as Contributors to Medical Error." Spear, Steven J., and Mark Schmidhofer. Annals of Internal Medicine Vol. 142, No. 8 (2005): 627-630.
- "Medical Education as a Process Management Problem." Armstrong, Elizabeth G., Marie Mackey, and Steven J. Spear. Academic Medicine Vol. 79, No. 8 (2004): 721-728.
- "Driving Improvement in Patient Care: Lessons from Toyota." Thompson, Debra N., Gail A. Wolf, and Steven J. Spear. Journal of Nursing Administration Vol. 33, No. 11 (2003): 585-595.
- "The Essence of Just-in-Time: Embedding Diagnostic Tests in Work-Systems to Achieve Operational Excellence." Spear, Steven J. Production Planning and Control Vol. 13, No. 8 (2002): 754-767.
- "When Problem Solving Prevents Organizational Learning." Tucker, Anita L., Amy C. Edmondson, and Steven J. Spear. Journal of Organizational Change Management Vol. 15, No. 2 (2002): 122-137.
- "The Toyota Production System: An Example of Managing Complex Social/Technical Systems." Spear, Steven J. Harvard University, 1999.
