= Charles Spear =

American Universalist minister

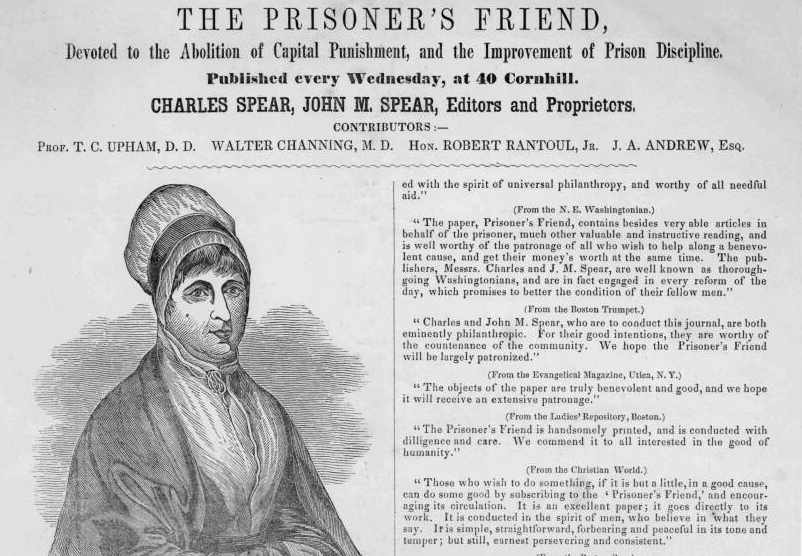
The Prisoner's Friend circa 1846

Charles Spear (May 1, 1803 – April 13, 1863) was a Universalist minister who advocated for the abolishment of the death penalty, supported prison reform, and founded the newspaper Prisoner's Friend. The Prisoner's Friend was advertised as "the only journal known in the world that is wholly devoted to the abolition of capital punishment and the reformation of the criminal."

Charles was born in Boston on May 1, 1803, and was a member of the Universalist Church of America. Charles Spear was the younger brother of John Murray Spear. Charles studied for the Universalist ministry in Roxbury, Massachusetts.

Later in life he began to criticize the death penalty. In 1830 he fought against the death penalty, the harsh treatment of prisoners, the conditions of jails, and struggled for a change from the prevailing philosophy of vindication to rehabilitation.

Through Spear's efforts, prison conditions improved significantly, the death penalty was abolished in three states and imposed less often in others.

He and his wife would frequently visit the Centre School in Dedham.

Spear died on April 13, 1863, and held funeral services in Washington, D.C.
