= Chloe Spear =

Enslaved African-American in Boston, Massachusetts (b. 1767, d. 1815)

- Born: c. 1749
- Died: 1815; Boston, MA
- Other name: Lady of Boston
- Known for: Enslaved by Captain John Bradford
- Spouse: Cesar Spear

Chloe Spear (c. 1749–1815) was an African-born woman who lived both an enslaved and free life in Boston. Her memoir was published anonymously, with Lady of Boston listed as its author. The memoir intends to provide "a Christian testimony, chronicling Spear's spiritual evolution by framing her life story with her religious development." The writer of the Memoir of Mrs. Chloe Spear comments on the institution of slavery as well as on Christianity and its teachings.

== Life ==
Chloe Spear was enslaved from around the age of 12. She was born in 1749 and probably arrived in Philadelphia in 1761. Spear was purchased and enslaved by Captain John Bradford, a member of a prominent Boston family. According to researcher Jared Ross Hardesty, throughout her enslavement, Spear was "free to engage in a number of 'domestic avocations.'" Spear's mistress valued her skills, and even offered to have her care for a sick neighbor. Although Chloe Spear's enslaver was grateful for her service to his family and gave her some freedom while living with them, when he caught her learning how to read, he "threatened to suspend her by her two thumbs and severely whip her if he found her doing so again." After the American Revolutionary War, Spear and the Bradfords traveled to Andover, Massachusetts, approximately twenty miles north of Boston. However, they eventually all returned to Boston together. Records of the Second Baptist Church in Boston show that Chloe Spear was baptized there and later married a man named Cesar Spear. Spear was also a member of Boston's African Baptist Church.

During their marriage, Chloe and Cesar Spear had seven children, all of whom she outlived. After Massachusetts abolished slavery in 1783, Spear and her husband opened a boarding house for sailors and workers. After Cesar's death, the home also served as a site for religious meetings and social gatherings for people of all races. This led to Spear becoming a beloved figure in both white and Black religious and working communities.

In 1798, Chloe Spear purchased a house in Boston's South End neighborhood, near Hanover Street.

Spear died from severe arthritis and "rheumatic affections" in 1815; she was buried in the Bradford family's vault, located in Boston's Granary Burial-Place. Spear was featured in five obituaries across Boston newspapers. A minister wrote a biography of her, which was published in a Baptist missionary magazine." The first biographical account of her life was in 1832 by Dr. Thomas Baldwin, a minister of the Second Baptist Church, who published the Memoir of Mrs. Chloe Spear. It was published just two months after she died.

== Memoir ==
Spear's memoir begins with the words, "In noticing the dates, it will be perceived that the subject of the Memoir has been dead, a little more than seventeen years, is introduced in the preface of the Memoir." The author of the memoir does not give herself a name, calling herself only "A Lady of Boston" or "A Member of the Second Baptist Church in Boston". The author of the "memoir" was a white woman who was a fellow congregant at Boston's Second Baptist Church.

The memoir highlights Spear's piety and industry. It describes the torture that Spear endured from her master for learning how to read, despite which she continued her quest for knowledge. The Memoir does not describe the connection that Spear had with other women and men of color, however.

== Spear's will ==
Other sources corroborate and augment many of the memoir's details about Spear's religious activities and property acquisition. Primary among these is Spear's will, which she signed with an X.

Spear's will left five hundred dollars to her grandson, who lived in Salem then. Additionally, she gave clothing, linen, and twenty to twenty-five dollars each to six women, "most of them identifiable as women of color who attended Second Baptist Church." Along with these individuals, "fifty dollars apiece went to Cesar Fletcher, whom Spear identified as a man of Colour named for my late husband, and Primus Grounds, a Man of Colour and at Present a member of the Second Baptist Church in this town."

By comparing Spear's will to fifty contemporary estates, historian Margot Minardi has shown that Spear had amassed significant property despite having been enslaved for thirty years. Items listed in Spear's estate included: "utilitarian household items (such as a 'Bake Kettle Spider & old Skillett'); the tools of a laundress ('1 Pair Flat Irons,' '1 Folding Board & Bench'); and several luxury goods and furnishings ('1 Ebony Tea Table,' '2 Small Looking Glasses,' '5 Pictures,' and a seven-dollar 'Brass Fire Sett')." Her assets included $625 in "Notes of Hand" (IOUs). Although Spear economized, Minardi concluded, "she also allowed herself some of the household goods that served as markers of refinement in the early nineteenth century."
