= Norman Bodek =

American teacher and consultant

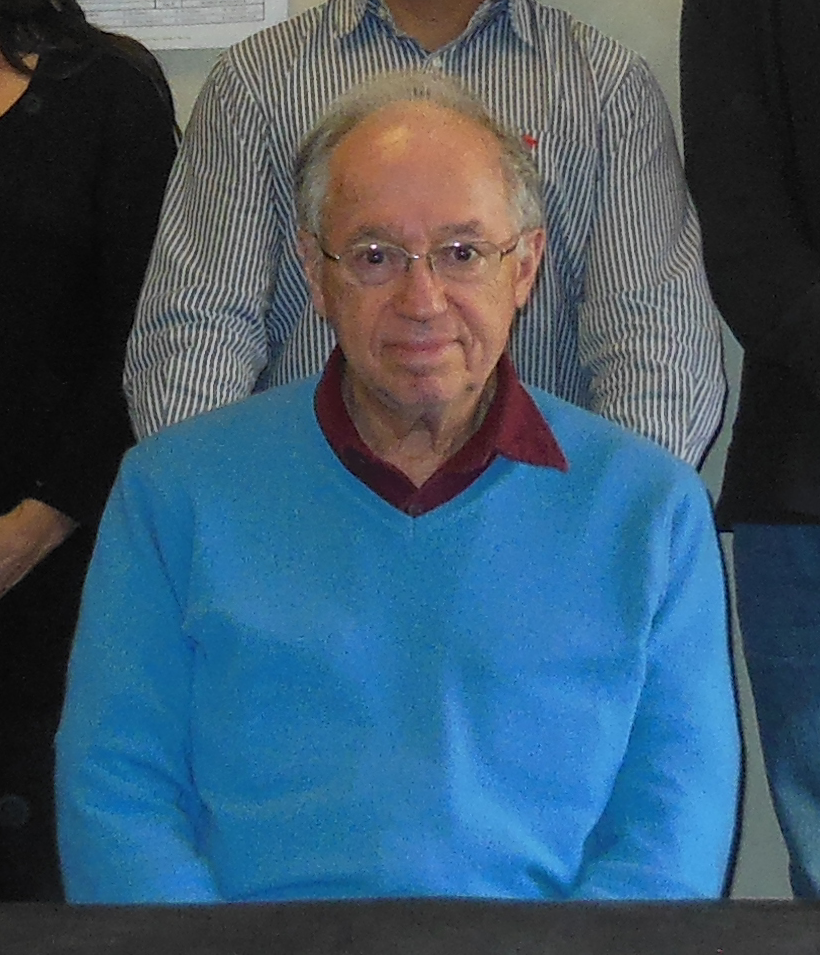
- Born: August 12, 1932; New York City
- Died: December 10, 2020 (aged 88); Kirishima, Japan
- Occupations: Consultant, author, publisher
- Known for: Introducing Lean to US manufacturing through his 89 trips to Japan, visiting over 250 companies and meeting the Japanese masters who created the Toyota Production System and publishing their books in English.

Norman Bodek was a teacher, consultant, author, and publisher who published more than 100 Japanese management books in English, including works by Taiichi Ohno and Dr. Shigeo Shingo. He taught a course on "The Best of Japanese Management Practices" at Portland State University. Bodek created the Shingo Prize with Dr. Vern Beuhler at Utah State University. He was elected to Industry Week's Manufacturing Hall of Fame and founded Productivity Press. He was also the President of PCS Press. He died on December 9, 2020, at the age of 88.

== Early life ==
In 1979, after working for 18 years with data processing companies, Bodek started Productivity Inc. and Press (which became an imprint of CRC Press) by publishing a newsletter called 'Productivity'.

In 1980, he attended an Industry Week conference in New York, where Joji Arai, a manager with the Japan Productivity Center, spoke about his role in bringing Japanese businesspeople to the US to study American industry. Bodek asked Arai if he could bring Americans to Japan to study Japanese management. Arai agreed and set up Bodek's first study mission to Japan.

Productivity Press discovered Shigeo Shingo in 1981 and published some of its first books in 1983 and 1985.

== Later work and visits to Japan ==
Bodek's fascination with manufacturing led him to Japan and a lifelong exploration of the methods behind Japanese quality and productivity. Over three decades, up until 2016, Bodek went to Japan 86 times, visited more than 250 plants and published over 250 management books. As a fortune cookie once told him, "You have the talent to discover the talent in others."

Bodek claims to have found tools, techniques and new thoughts that have revolutionized the world of manufacturing. He met Dr. W. Edwards Deming, Dr. Joseph Juran, Phil Crosby, Dr. Kaoru Ishikawa, Dr. Yoji Akao, Mr. Taiichi Ohno, Dr. Shigeo Shingo and other manufacturing masters and published many of their books in English. Each person he met gave him a new perspective on continuous improvement and helped him to better understand links between the functional areas of the Toyota management system, and the value of Lean, Kaizen in achieving quality and continuous improvement.

Bodek led more than 25 study missions to Japan. He was one of the first to publish books and training materials on SMED, CEDAC, Quality Control Circles, 5S, and the Visual Factory Total Productive Maintenance, Value Stream Mapping, Kaizen and Kaizen Blitz, Cell Design, Poka-Yoke, Andon, Hoshin Kanri, and Kanban. Other books followed, on topics including total quality management.

Many of these topics form the building blocks of the Toyota Production System, which, in turn, is the basis for what came to be called Lean Manufacturing in America. For example, a book on Lean Accounting can be seen as Westerner's guide to creating a Toyota-like accounting system.

In the 1980s Bodek ran conferences and seminars, and brought Japanese authors to America. He initiated a number of publishing-partnerships that would span several years. For instance, under Bodek's leadership Productivity Press first published Shingo in 1985 and Hirano in 1989. There were more titles by Hirano from Productivity in the 1990s, and PCS in 2006.

Bodek said his most important discovery was how Japanese companies brought out the potential in their workers.

"When you unlock this hidden talent people become highly motivated and actually love to come to work," he said.

Since 1999, Bodek has focused on Toyota's second pillar, "Respect for People, employee-development and employee-empowerment."

== Harada Method: the human side to Lean ==
The Harada Method is designed to teach people how to be great leaders, coaches, and to build a winning team.

On his 75th trip to Japan, Bodek met Mr Takashi Harada, who Bodek believed had the ultimate recipe for competing against low-cost labor in China and India. By 2011, the Harada Method had become recognized as one of the most systematic ways to enhance employee development. Harada has been adopted by Kirin Brewery, Uniqlo (retail clothing), Nomura Securities (financial services), The Bank of Tokyo-Mitsubishi UFJ, and Chugai Pharmaceuticals.

Harada sees his method as the next step in the Lean journey. He believes it integrates easily with Six Sigma, Hoshin Planning, and other continuous improvement efforts, to give real substance to what Toyota calls “respect for people.” Bodek claims employers can use Harada to embed continuous improvement in workplace culture.

The essence of the Harada Method is “self-reliance.” Self-reliance is the ability of each person to become so skilled at something that she or he is virtually irreplaceable. They become artisans in disciplines that serves their future and also the success of their organization. People are fully trusted to make responsible decisions for themselves and for the organization they work for. Shohei Ohtani, the MVP in Japanese professional baseball, used the Harada Method when he was a Sophomore in High School, setting his clear goal to be a great baseball player. Recent rumors are he is worth over $300 million when he joins the American Professional Baseball League in 2018.

== Teaching ==
As adjunct professor at Portland State University's School of Business Administration, Bodek taught "The Best of Japanese Management Practices". In addition to a focus on lean tools and techniques, Bodek also taught the Harada Method to his students. His books including How to do Kaizen were among the readings for the 'ISQA 410' course in logistics, for Spring 2012.

== Recognition ==
In 2005, Bodek won the Books and Monographs category of the Shingo Prize for Excellence in Manufacturing, a prize that awards companies worldwide that "achieve world-class operational excellence status", for his book, Kaikaku, The Power and Magic of Lean.

In 2010, Bodek was inducted into Industry Week's Manufacturing Hall of Fame. The award recognized him as one of a team of "industrial superstars whose collective careers have had an immeasurable impact and influence on U.S. manufacturing."

Bodek was inducted into the Association for Manufacturing Excellence Hall of Fame in 2019. The AME Hall of Fame recognizes industry thought leaders and influencers who support the values, principles and practices found within leading enterprise excellence organizations.

Norman recently wrote a new book, A Miraculous Life, where he shares what he learned throughout his life from numerous masters in management and in the spiritual world. He hopes that reading his miracles will encourage others to recognize the marvelous opportunities that they have to live wonderfully well and also to serve others.

== See also ==
- CRC Press, part of the Taylor & Francis publishing group, owned by Informa plc.

== Bibliography ==
- The Idea Generator – Quick and Easy Kaizen (PCS Press 2001), co-authored with Bunji Tozawa
- The Idea Generator – Workbook (PCS Press 2002)
- Kaikaku: The Power and Magic of Lean (PCS Press 2004)
- All You Gotta Do Is Ask (PCS Press 2005), co-authored with Chuck Yorke
- Waddell, William H.; Bodek, Norman (2005). Rebirth of American Industry: A Study of Lean Management. Vancouver, WA: PCS Press. ISBN 978-0-9712436-3-7.
- How to Do Kaizen co-authored with Bunji Tozawa (PCS Press 2010)
- Harada, Takashi; Bodek, Norman (2012). Harada Method: The Spirit of Self Reliance. Vancouver, WA: PCS Press. ISBN 9780971243606.
- Hisano, Kazuyoshi; Bodek, Norman (2020). CEO Coaching: How to grow without limits!. PCS Press.
