= Yōji =

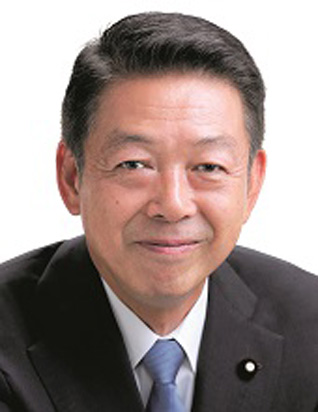
- Yoji Muto, Japanese politician
- Pronunciation: joɯdʑi (IPA)
- Gender: Male

Origin
- Origin: Japan
- Meaning: Depends on the kanji used

Other names
- Alternative spelling: Yozi (Kunrei-shiki) Yozi (Nihon-shiki) Yōji, Yoji, Youji (Hepburn)

Yōji, Yoji, Youji, or Yohji is a common masculine Japanese given name

== Written forms ==
Yōji can be written using different kanji characters and can mean:

- 洋二, "ocean, second"
- 洋次, "ocean, next"
- 洋司, "ocean, rule"
- 洋治, "ocean, govern"
- 陽二, "sunshine, second"
- 陽次, "sunshine, next"
- 陽司, "sunshine, rule"
- 陽治, "sunshine, govern"

The name can also be written in hiragana ようじ or katakana ヨウジ.

== People with the given name ==
with the given name Yōji

- Yoji (DJ), a Japanese trance/hard trance DJ
- Yoji Akao (赤尾 洋二; 1928–2016), Japanese planning specialist
- Yoji Anjo (安生 洋二; born 1967), Japanese professional wrestler and mixed martial arts fighter
- Yōji Enokido (榎戸 洋司; born 1963), Japanese screenwriter and novelist
- Yoji Harada (原田 洋二郎; 1972–2019), Japanese tattoo artist and musician
- Yoji Ito (伊藤 庸二; 1901–1955), Japanese engineer and scientist
- Yoji Iwase (岩瀬 洋志; born 2004), Japanese actor
- Yoji Kondo (近藤 陽次; 1933–2017), Japanese-born American astrophysicist
- Yōji Kuri (久里 洋二; 1928–2024), Japanese cartoonist and independent filmmaker
- Yōji Matsuda (松田 洋治; born 1967), Japanese actor and voice actor
- Yoji Muto (武藤 容治; born 1955), Japanese politician
- Yoji Nagaoka (永岡 洋治; born 1950), Japanese politician
- Yoji Nakajima (中島 洋治; born 1964), Japanese wheelchair curler
- Yoji Omoto (大本 洋嗣; born 1967), Japanese water polo coach
- Yoji Sakate (坂手 洋二; born 1962), Japanese playwright
- Yoji Sasaki (佐々木 陽次; born 1992), Japanese footballer
- Yoji Sato (佐藤 要ニ; born 1949), Japanese former handball player
- Yoji Shimizu (清水 洋二; born 1941), Japanese water polo player
- Yoji Shinkawa (新川 洋司; born 1971), Japanese illustrator and conceptual artist
- Yōji Takikawa (滝川 洋二; born 1949), Japanese pedagogist and professor
- Yōji Tanaka (田中 要次; born 1963), Japanese actor and tarento
- Yoji Totsuka (戸塚 洋二; 1942–2008), Japanese physicist
- Yōji Ueda (上田 燿司; born 1971), Japanese voice actor
- Yōji Yamada (山田 洋次; born 1931), Japanese film director
- Yohji Yamamoto (山本 耀司; born 1943), Japanese fashion designer

== Fictional characters ==
- Yoji Kudou (工藤 耀爾), a character in the anime series Weiß Kreuz
- Yoji Kuramoto (倉元 洋二), a character in Battle Royale
- Yoji/Yo-Yoji (alias, true name unknown), a character from The Secret Series
