= Hoshin =

Hoshin may refer to:

- Hoshin Kanri, a strategic planning methodology (Plan-Do-Check-Act) developed by Yoji Akao, used to create goals, assign them measurable milestones, and assess progress against those milestones
- Hoshin Budo Ryu, an American martial arts system
- Anzan Hoshin Roshi, leader of the White Wind Zen Community

== See also ==
- Battle Houshin: (Commonly misspelled, "Hoshin") is another name for the game known as "Mystic Heroes"
