= Sanyo Gakuen College =

Coordinates: 34°38′32.4″N 133°56′37.8″E

- 山陽学園短期大学
- Type: Private
- Established: 1969
- Location: Naka-ku, Okayama, Japan
- Website: http://www.sguc.ac.jp/junior.html

Sanyo Gakuen College (山陽学園短期大学, San'yō Gakuen Tanki Daigaku) is a private junior college in Naka-ku, Okayama, Japan.

== Academic departments ==
- Child education
- Nutrition

== History ==
- The predecessor of the college was established in 1886 as Sanyo Eiwa Women's School.
- Sanyo Gakuen College was founded in 1969, for women only.
- The college became coeducational in 2009.

== See also ==
- Sanyo Gakuen University
- List of junior colleges in Japan
