= Okayama Prefecture =

Prefecture of Japan

Okayama Prefecture 岡山県
- Prefecture

Japanese transcription(s)
  - Japanese: 岡山県
  - Rōmaji: Okayama-ken
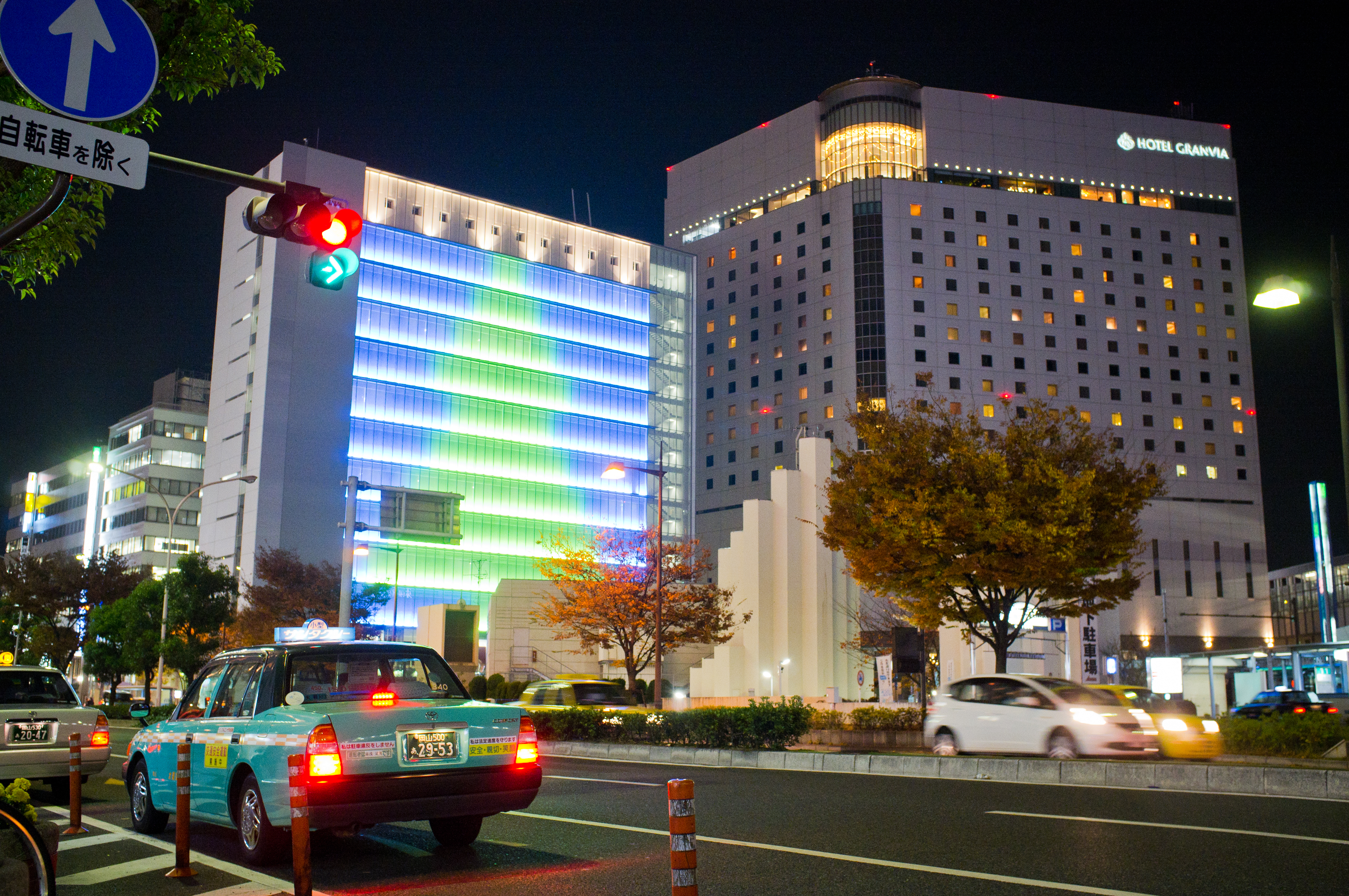
- A street in Okayama City, Okayama Prefecture at night

- Flag Symbol
- Anthem: Okayama-ken no uta
- Coordinates: 34°39′42″N 133°56′05″E
- Country: Japan
- Region: Chūgoku (Sanyō)
- Island: Honshu
- Capital: Okayama
- Subdivisions: Districts: 10, Municipalities: 27

Government
  - Governor: Ryūta Ibaragi

Area
  - Total: 7,114.50 km^{2} (2,746.92 sq mi)
  - Rank: 17th

Population (1 October 2025)
  - Total: 1,815,165
  - Rank: 20th
  - Density: 255.136/km^{2} (660.799/sq mi)

GDP
  - Total: JP¥ 7,345 billion US$ 54.2 billion (2022)
- ISO 3166 code: JP-33
- Website: www.pref.okayama.jp
- Symbols of Japan
- Bird: Lesser cuckoo (Cuculus poliocephalus)
- Flower: Peach blossom (Prunus persica var. vulgaris)
- Tree: Red pine (Pinus densiflora)

Okayama Prefecture (岡山県, Okayama-ken; Japanese pronunciation: [ò̞.kä́.jä̀.mä̀, -jä́.mä́.kè̞ɴ̀]) is a prefecture of Japan located in the Chūgoku region of Honshu. Okayama Prefecture has a population of 1,815,165 (1 October 2025) and has a geographic area of 7,114 km^{2} (2,746 sq mi). Okayama Prefecture borders Tottori Prefecture to the north, Hyōgo Prefecture to the east, and Hiroshima Prefecture to the west.

Okayama is the capital and largest city of Okayama Prefecture, with other major cities including Kurashiki, Tsuyama, and Sōja. Okayama Prefecture's south is located on the Seto Inland Sea coast across from Kagawa Prefecture on the island of Shikoku, which are connected by the Great Seto Bridge, while the north is characterized by the Chūgoku Mountains.

== History ==
Prior to the Meiji Restoration of 1868, the area of present-day Okayama Prefecture was divided between Bitchū, Bizen and Mimasaka Provinces. Okayama Prefecture was formed and named in 1871 as part of the large-scale administrative reforms of the early Meiji period (1868–1912), and the borders of the prefecture were set in 1876.

== Geography ==
Map of Okayama Prefecture Government Ordinance Designated City City Town Village

Okayama Prefecture borders Hyōgo Prefecture, Tottori Prefecture, and Hiroshima Prefecture. It faces Kagawa Prefecture in Shikoku across the Seto Inland Sea and includes 90 islands in the sea.

Okayama Prefecture is home to the historic town of Kurashiki. Most of the population is concentrated around Kurashiki and Okayama. The small villages in the northern mountain region are aging and declining in population - more than half of the prefecture's municipalities are officially designated as depopulated.

As of 1 April 2014, 11% of the total land area of the prefecture was designated as Natural Parks, namely the Daisen-Oki and Setonaikai National Parks; the Hyōnosen-Ushiroyama-Nagisan Quasi-National Park; and seven Prefectural Natural Parks.

=== Cities ===
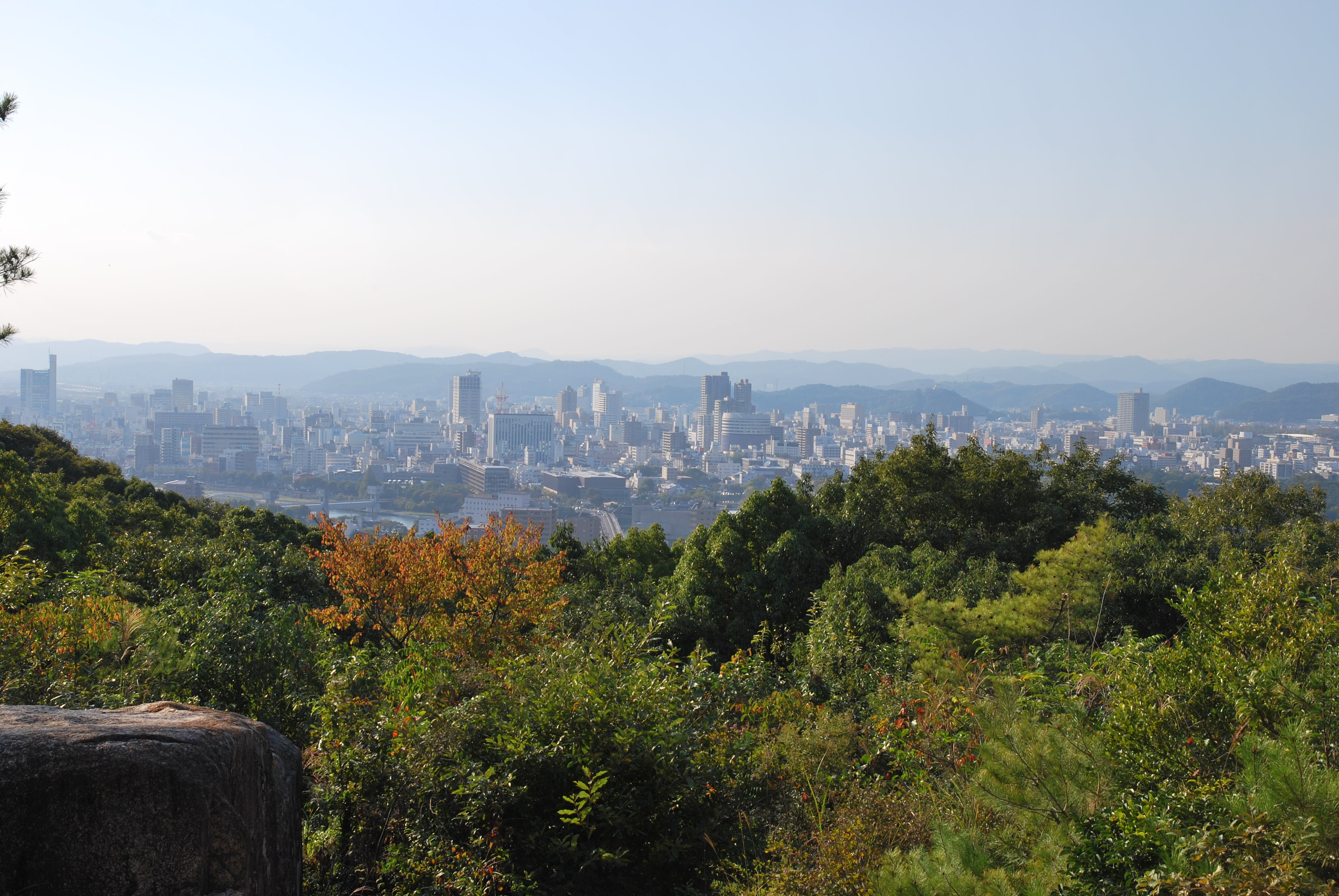
Okayama City

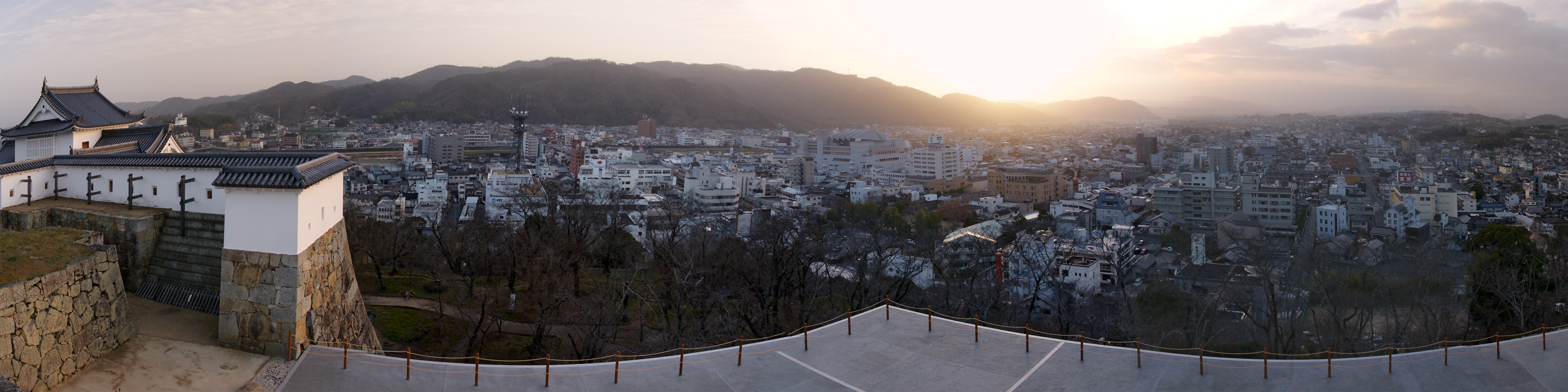
Tsuyama

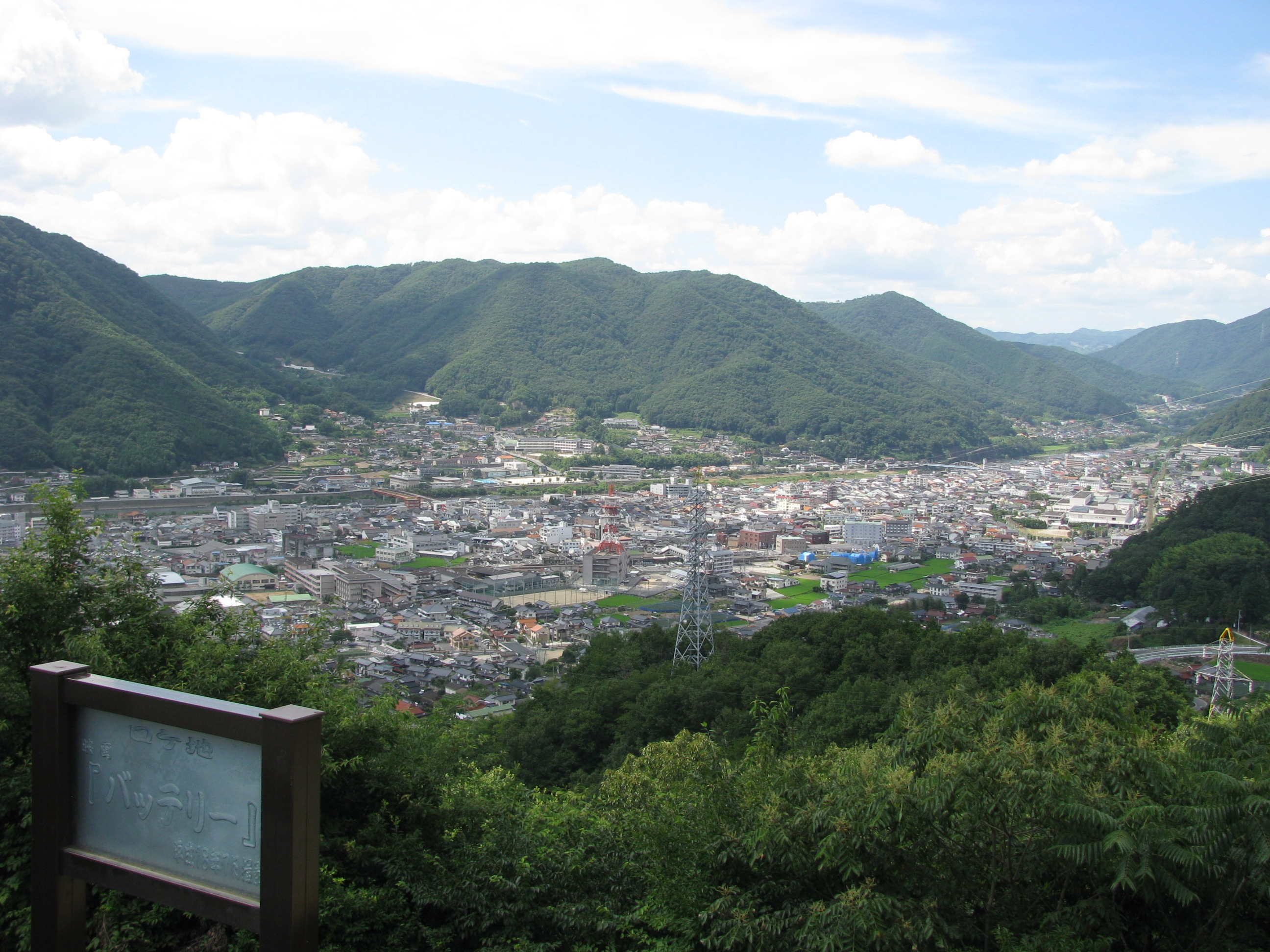
Takahashi

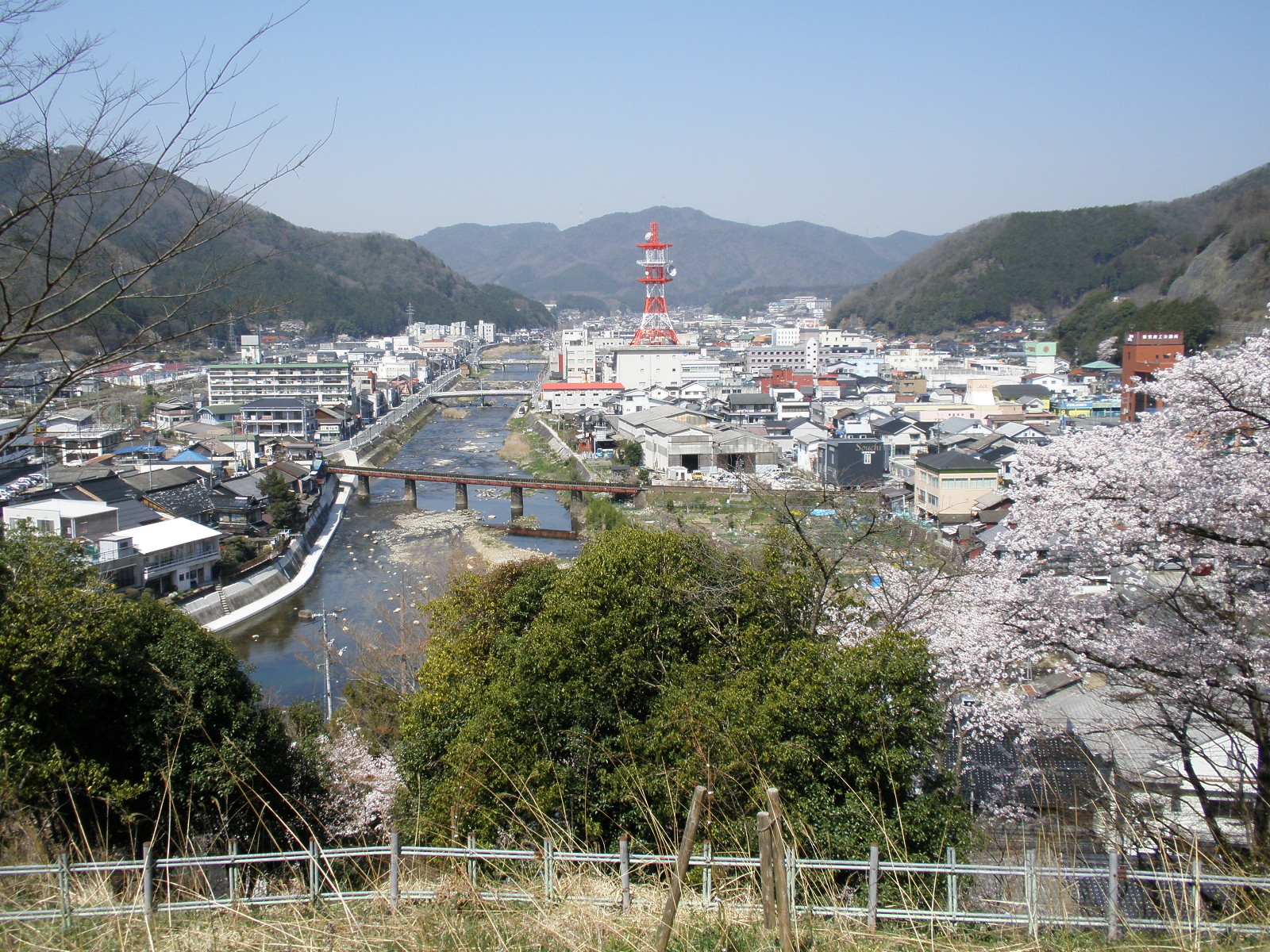
Niimi

Fifteen cities are located in Okayama Prefecture:

Name		Area (km^{2})	Population	Map
Rōmaji	Kanji	Area (km^{2})	Population	Map
Akaiwa	赤磐市	209.43	44,498	
Asakuchi	浅口市	66.46	35,022	
Bizen	備前市	258.23	35,610	
Ibara	井原市	243.36	41,460	
Kasaoka	笠岡市	136.03	50,160	
Kurashiki	倉敷市	355.63	483,576	
Maniwa	真庭市	828.43	44,265	
Mimasaka	美作市	429.19	28,502	
Niimi	新見市	793.27	30,583	
Okayama (capital)	岡山市	789.92	720,841	
Setouchi	瀬戸内市	125.51	37,934	
Sōja	総社市	212	67,059	
Takahashi	高梁市	547.01	31,556	
Tamano	玉野市	103.61	60,101	
Tsuyama	津山市	506.36	102,294	

=== Towns and villages ===
These are the towns and villages in each district:

Name		Area (km^{2})	Population	District	Type	Map
Rōmaji	Kanji	Area (km^{2})	Population	District	Type	Map
Hayashima	早島町	7.62	12,671	Tsukubo District	Town	
Kagamino	鏡野町	419.69	14,651	Tomata District	Town	
Kibichūō	吉備中央町	268.73	11,989	Kaga District	Town	
Kumenan	久米南町	78.65	4,962	Kume District	Town	
Misaki	美咲町	232.15	17,776	Kume District	Town	
Nagi	奈義町	69.54	5,861	Katsuta District	Town	
Nishiawakura	西粟倉村	57.93	1,437	Aida District	Village	
Satoshō	里庄町	12.23	11,204	Asakuchi District	Town	
Shinjō	新庄村	67.1	951	Maniwa District	Village	
Shōō	勝央町	54.09	11,237	Katsuta District	Town	
Wake	和気町	144.21	14,191	Wake District	Town	
Yakage	矢掛町	90.62	14,041	Oda District	Town	

== Demographics ==
Okayama prefecture population pyramid in 2020

Per Japanese census data, and, Okayama prefecture has had continual negative population growth since 2005

Historical population
Year	Pop.	±%
1920	1,218,000	—
1930	1,284,000	+5.4%
1940	1,329,000	+3.5%
1950	1,661,000	+25.0%
1960	1,670,000	+0.5%
1970	1,707,000	+2.2%
1980	1,871,000	+9.6%
1990	1,926,000	+2.9%
2000	1,950,828	+1.3%
2010	1,945,276	−0.3%
2020	1,920,739	−1.3%

== Education ==
=== Universities ===
- Okayama
  - Notre Dame Seishin University
  - Okayama Shoka University
  - Okayama University
  - Okayama University of Science
  - Sanyo Gakuen University
  - Shujitsu University
  - Shujitsu Junior College
- Kurashiki
  - Kawasaki University of Medical Welfare
  - Kurashiki Sakuyo University
  - Okayama Gakuin University
- Soja
  - Okayama Prefectural University
- Tsuyama
  - Mimasaka University
- Niimi
  - Niimi Public University

=== High schools ===
- Okayama
  - Kurashiki High School
  - Okayama Asahi Senior High School
  - Okayama Takahashi High School
  - Okayama Ichinomiya Senior High School
  - Okayama Hosen Senior High School
  - Okayama Joto Senior High School
  - Okayama Sakuyo High School
  - Okayama Sozan Senior High School

== Transportation ==
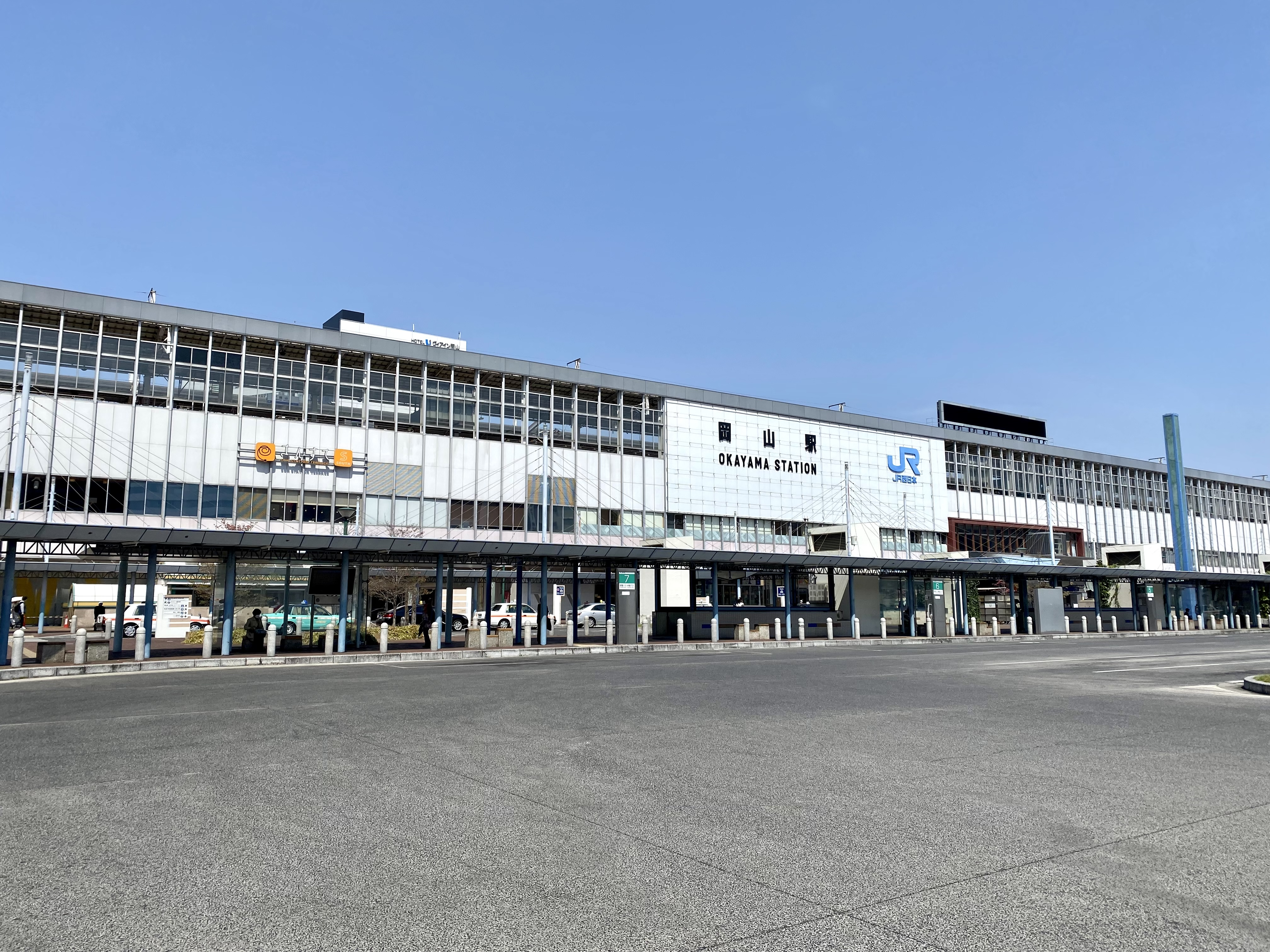
JR Okayama Station

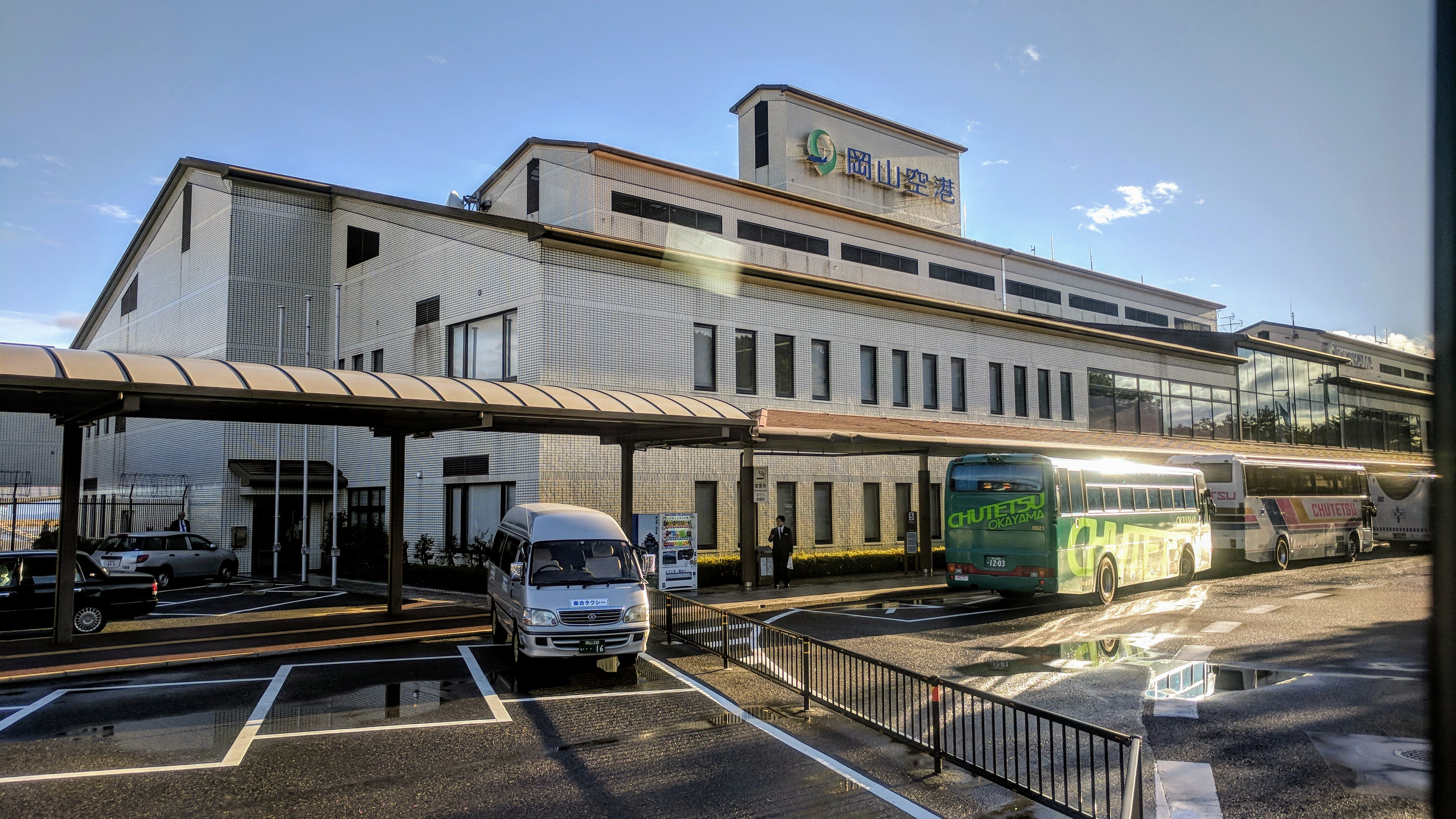
Okayama Momotarō Airport

=== Rail ===
- JR West
  - Ako Line
  - Geibi Line
  - Inbi Line
  - Hakubi Line
  - Kibi Line
  - Kishin Line
  - Sanyo Shinkansen
  - Sanyo Line
  - Tsuyama Line
  - Uno Line
- JR West and JR Shikoku
  - Honshi-bisan Line
  - Seto-Ōhashi Line
- Chizu Express
- Ibara Railway
- Mizushima Rinkai Railway

=== Tramways ===
- Okayama Electric Tramway

=== Roads ===
==== Expressways ====
- Chugoku Expressway
- Okayama Expressway
- Sanyo Expressway
- Seto Central Expressway
- Tottori Expressway
- Yonago Expressway

==== National highways ====
- Route 2 (Osaka-Kobe-Himeji-Bizen-Okayama-Kurashiki-Asakuchi-Onomichi-Hiroshima-Shūnan-Shimonoseki-Kitakyushu)
- Route 30 (Okayama-Uno-Takamatsu
- Route 53 (Okayama-Tsuyama-Tottori)
- Route 179
- Route 180 (Okayama-Takahashi-Niimi)
- Route 181 (Tsuyama-Maniwa-Yonago-Yasugi-Matsue)
- Route 182
- Route 183
- Route 250 (Okayama-Setouchi-Ako-Aioi-Takasago-Akashi)
- Route 313 (Fukuyama-Takahashi-Maniwa-Kurayoshi)
- Route 373
- Route 374
- Route 429
- Route 430
- Route 482 (Kyotango-Toyooka-Wakasa-Kagamino-Maniwa-Kōfu of Tottori
- Route 484

=== Airport ===
- Okayama Airport

== Culture ==
- Bizen-yaki (Bizen pottery)
- Bizen Osafune/Bitchu Aoe swords

=== Association with Momotarō legend ===
Okayama Prefecture is closely associated with the folklore hero, Momotarō. This tale is said to have roots in the legendary story of Kibitsuhiko-no-mikoto and Ura which explains that the Prince Ura of Kudara used to live in Kinojo (castle of the devil) and was a cause of trouble for the people living in the village. The emperor's government sent Kibitsuhiko-no-mikoto (Momotarō) to defeat Ura. The city of Okayama holds an annual Momotarō-matsuri, or Momotarō Festival.

=== Arts ===
- Inryoji Temple
- Hayashibara Museum of Art
- Okayama Orient Museum
- Okayama Prefectural Museum
- Okayama Prefectural Museum of Art
- Okayama Symphony Hall
- Yumeji Art Museum

== Sports ==
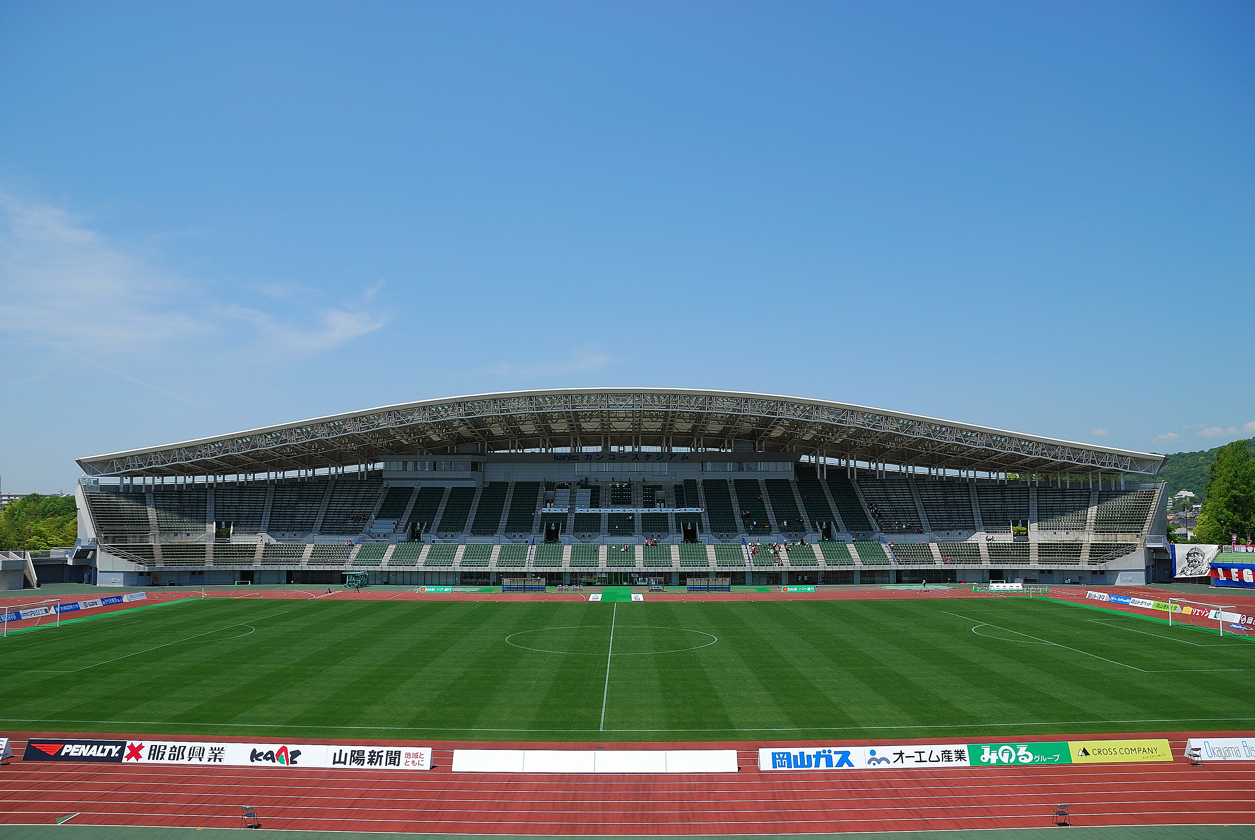
City Light Stadium.

The sports teams listed below are based in Okayama.

=== Football ===
- Fagiano Okayama FC (Okayama city)
- Mitsubishi Motors Mizushima FC (Kurashiki)

=== Volleyball ===
- Okayama Seagulls (Okayama city)

=== Basketball ===
- Tryhoop Okayama (B3 League, Okayama city)

== Tourism ==
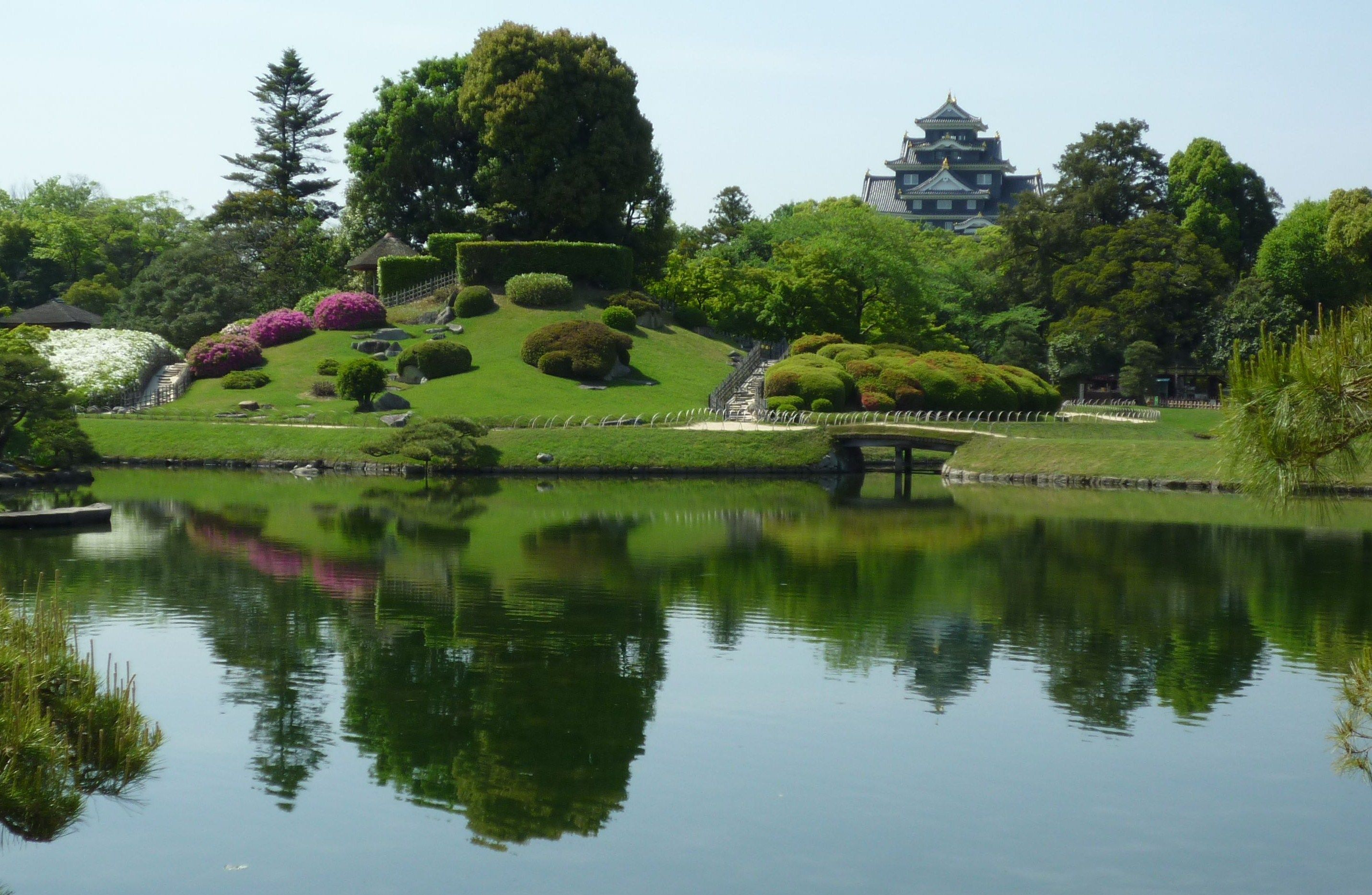
Okayama Korakuen Park and Okayama Castle

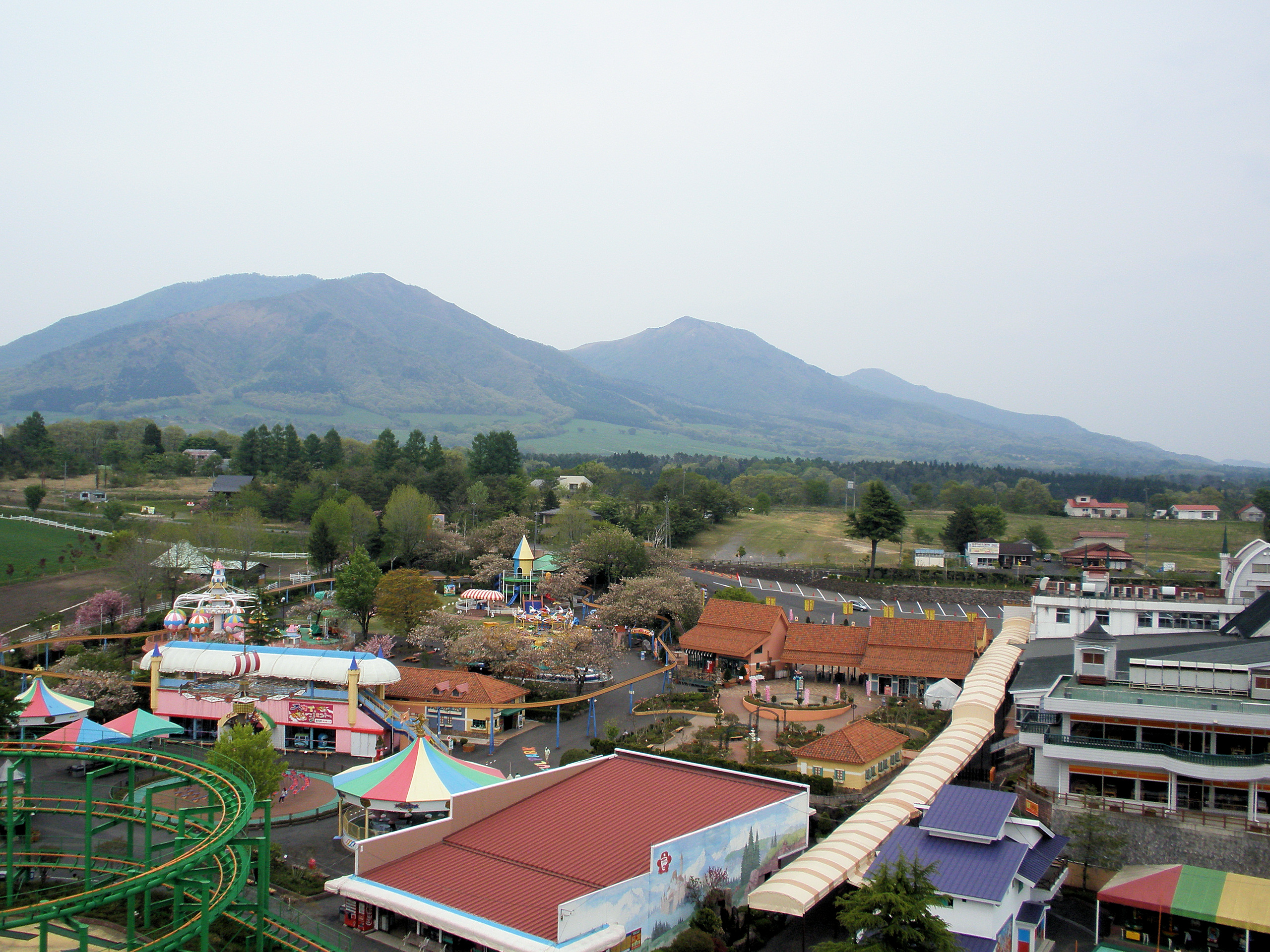
Hiruzen Plateau and Hiruzen Joyful Park in Maniwa

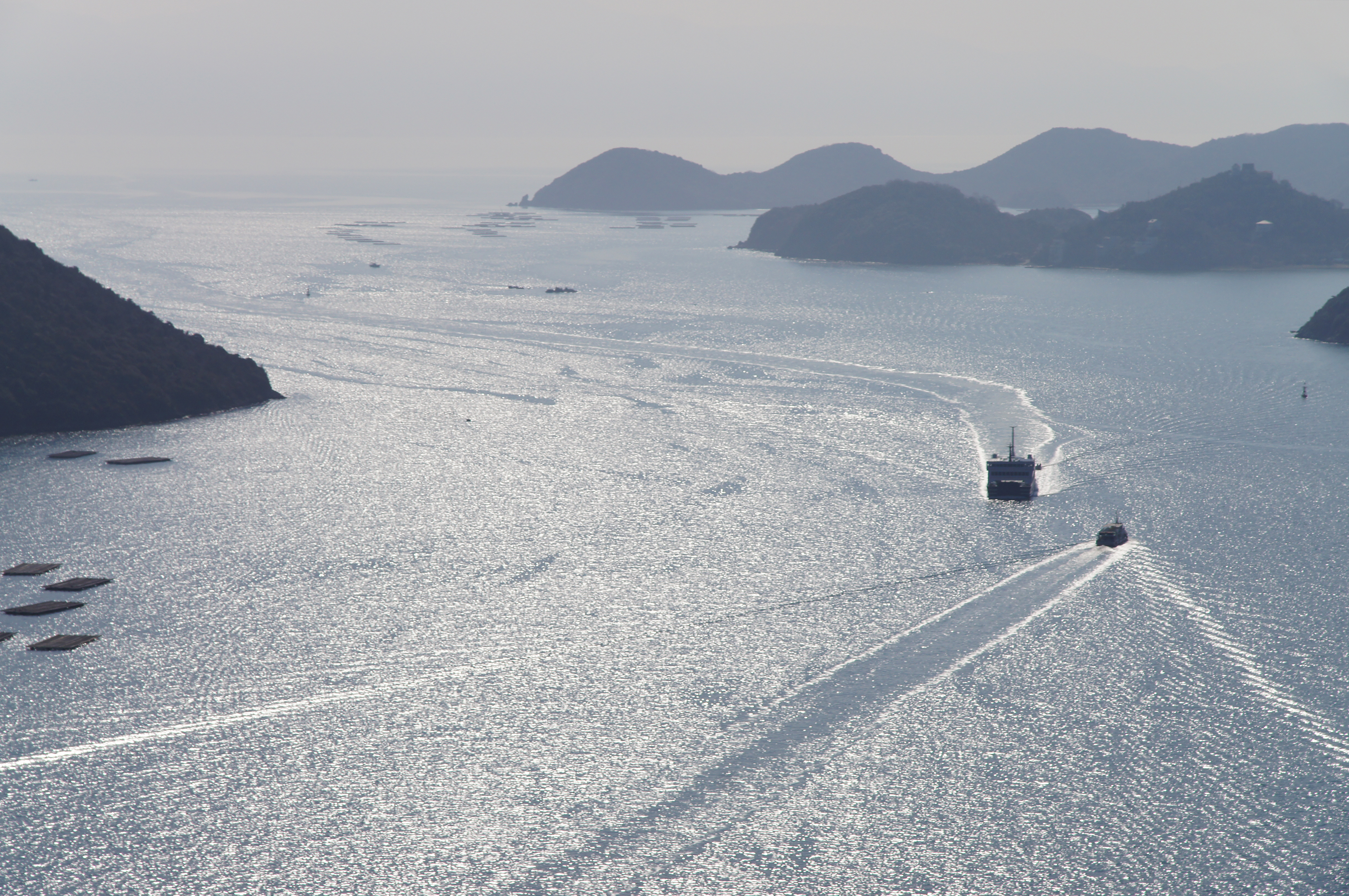
Hinase Island and Seto Inlandsea in Bizen

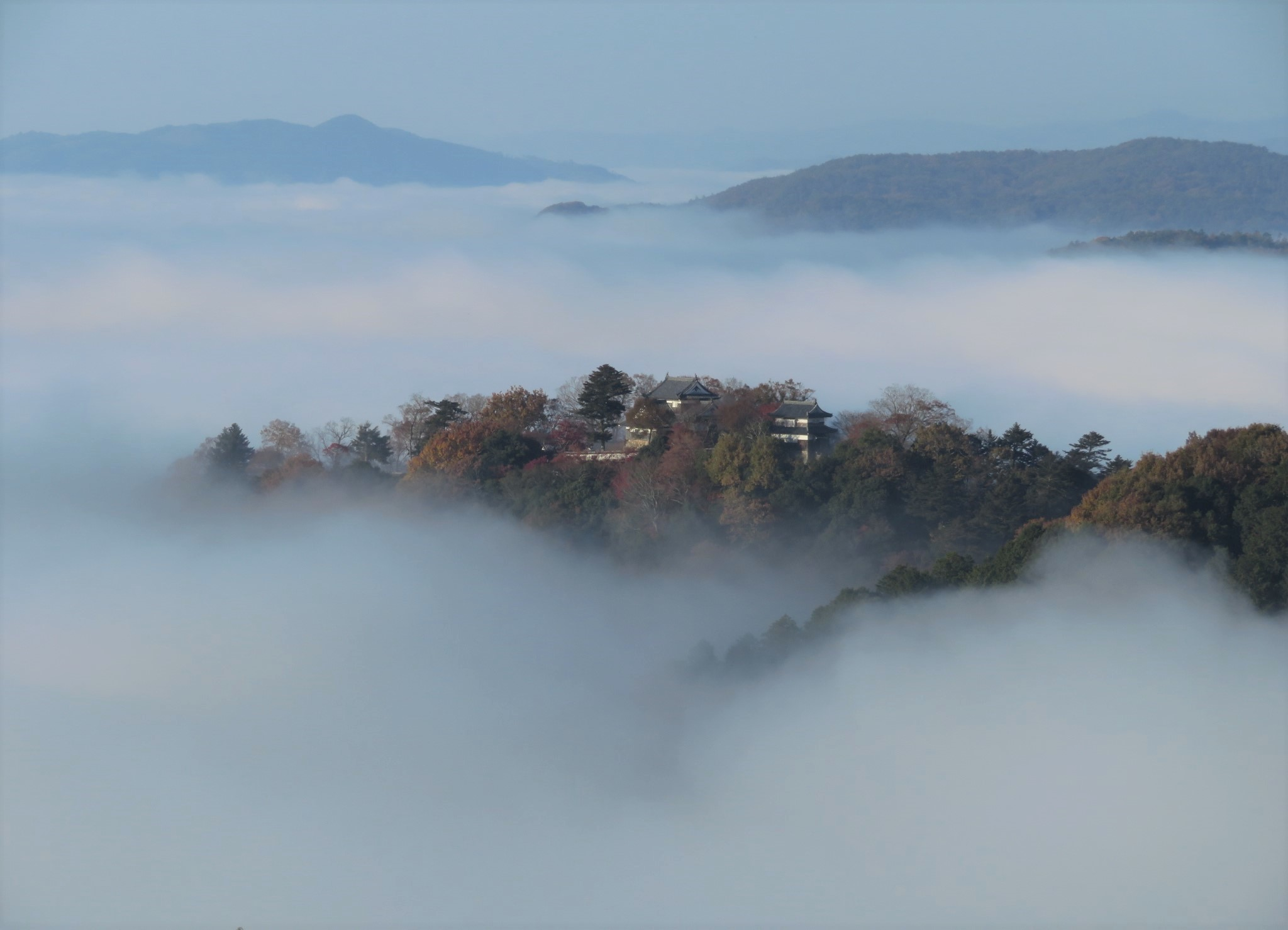
Bitchu Matsuyama Castle in Takahashi

Some tourist attractions are:

- Bikan Historical Area (倉敷美観地区, Kurashiki Bikan Chiku), Kurashiki
- Bisei Astronomical Observatory (美星天文台, Bisei Tenmondai), Ibara Town (following dissolution of Bisei Town)
- Bitchu Matsuyama Castle, Takahashi
- Brazilian Park Washuzan Highland, Kurashiki
- Kakuzan Park, Tsuyama
- Koraku-en Japanese garden in Okayama
- Ki Castle, Sōja
- Maki-do Cave, in Niimi
- Ohara Museum of Art, Kurashiki
- Okayama Castle, Okayama
- Shizutani School, Bizen

== Notable people ==
- Yuko Arimori (born 1966), marathon runner
- Kenji Doihara (1883–1948), army officer
- Tesshō Genda (born 1948), voice actor
- Morihiro Hashimoto (1977–2017), darts player
- Naoki Hoshino (1892–1978), politician
- Koshi Inaba (born 1964), singer
- Masaki Kajishima (born 1962), creator of Tenchi Muyo!
- Shiro Kawase (1889–1946), admiral
- Sadahiko Miyake (1891–1956), general
- Chiura Obata (1885–1975), artist
- Mori Takashi, former member of Gentouki
- Yōji Takikawa (born 1949), pedagogist
- Mutsuo Toi (1917–1938), perpetrator of the Tsuyama massacre
- Inukai Tsuyoshi (1855–1932), former Prime Minister of Japan
- Jiro Watanabe (born 1955), boxer
- Takeo Yasuda (1889–1964), lieutenant general
- Eisuke Yoshiyuki (1906–1940), author
- Masashi Kishimoto (born 1974), creator of Naruto
- Fujii Kaze (born 1997), singer
- Nishimura Riki, also known as Ni-ki of ENHYPEN (born 2005), K-pop idol, dancer, singer, rapper
- Issei Mamehara (born 2002), singer, dancer, member of JO1
