= Yumeji Art Museum =

- 夢二郷土美術館
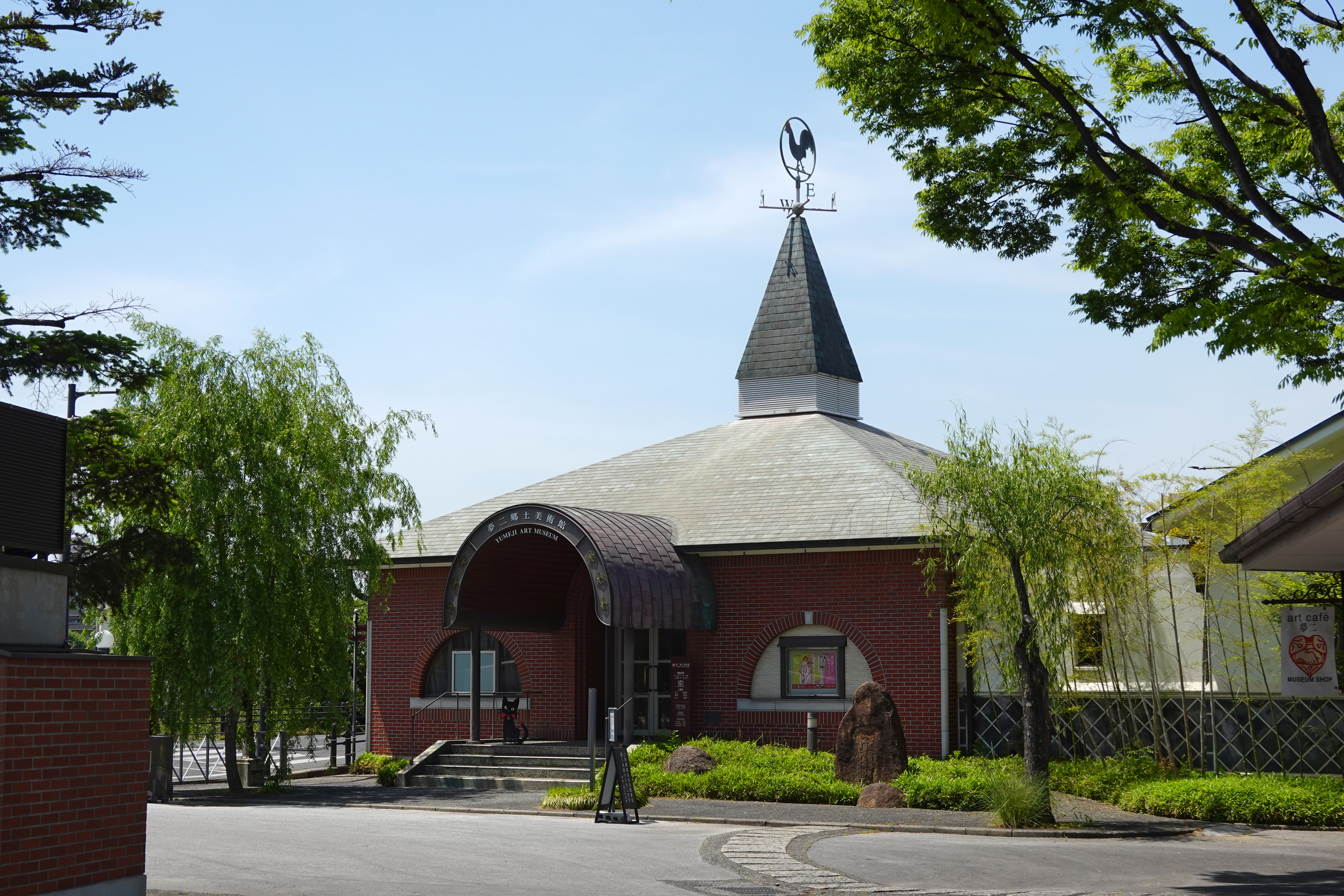
- Yumeji Art Museum, Okayama

- Yumeji Art Museum, Okayama Yumeji Art Museum (Japan)
- Established: March 1984
- Location: Naka-ku, Okayama
- Coordinates: 34°40′15″N 133°56′04″E
- Type: Art museum

Yumeji Art Museum (夢二郷土美術館, Yumeji Kyōdo Bijutsukan) is an art museum in Okayama Prefecture split between the main museum in Naka-ku, Okayama and the Yumeji Seika and Shonen Sanso annex built in Setouchi, the birthplace of Yumeji Takehisa, a poet and artist who was active in the early 1900s.

== Building ==
The Yumeji Seika is the house where Yumeji Takehisa grew up. It was converted into a museum in 1970. The house was given official status as an art museum in 1979 and that same year the Shonen Sanso, a reconstruction of his Tokyo studio with the help of his son, Fujihiko Takehisa. The Shonen Sanso features many of Takehisa's self-portraits and photography.

The main museum was built in Kita-ku, Okayama near Kōraku-en to house the works of Takehisa in 1984, 100 years after his birth. It has 100 works permanently on display while the museum's other 2,000 works are rotated. Some of his most famous works housed here include Tatsuta Hime, Aki no Ikoi (hanging scrolls), and Kamogawa (a hanging scroll) each featuring the Japanese beauties that encapsulate Takehisa's artistic style and preferred subjects.

== Awards ==
The main museum was bestowed the Suntory Regional and Cultural Prize in 1985, making it the first recipient in the prefecture.

== Mascot ==
Yumeji Art Museum's mascot is a cat named Kuro (lit. black). In March 2018, a special bus decorated with Kuro's likeness was introduced to make the connection from the station to the museum.

== See also ==
- Tama (cat), Stationmaster of Kishi Station, Wakayama, Japan
