= Setsuban Kanri =

Setsuban Kanri (節番管理) is the name of a production management methodology for make-to-order business companies. More specifically, it indicates a "management system by synchronized process blocks" which had been originally set and implemented as a management model for the control of the manufacturing progress with makers whose products were very much tailored upon the requests of their customers. It is specific to organizations where the production model is one of the following: DTO ("Design-to-order"), ETO ("Engineer-to-order"), ATO ("Assembly-to-order") or MTO ("Make-to-order").

== Origins ==
The first applications of this model concerned the Japanese railways and the aviation industry, which in the operational management of activities had been referring to a block by block workflow progress management system (what is meant literally by the expression "suishin kusei kōtei kanri" 推進区制工程管理).

This one was the root of the so-called Oiban kanri for series production management, of the Seiban kanri for discontinuous productions and of the Setsuban Kanri for make-to-order productions. The study and formalization of this threefold approach were run later on by JMA – the Japan Management Association, who could base their work on the most significant industrial experiences to date (such as the application of the oiban kanri at Kawasaki Heavy Industries). Besides, they could enrich and tune the methodological contents with specific implementation tools and gave meaningful contributions to the definition of the methodology itself, which was named Setsuban Kanri from the reading of the ideographic characters 節 (setsu = period/temporal unit) and 番 (ban = ordinal number) + 管理 (kanri = management, control).

Employed until the 1970s in many companies operating as make-to-order in Japan, for some decades it has fallen out of practice and knowledge. Since 2006, thanks to the direct initiative of Akira Kōdate, a Japanese engineer who launched it and promoted its application in Italy with JMAC Europe. Its name had a revival and it is now being adopted by several companies (among machine tools makers especially).

== Basic principles ==
The basic principles of the Setsuban Kanri are:

1. Awareness of both the "axes" (nijiku kanri 二軸管理) to be managed.

Make-order productions need a continuous monitoring to grant for integration and fair balance in-between the following:

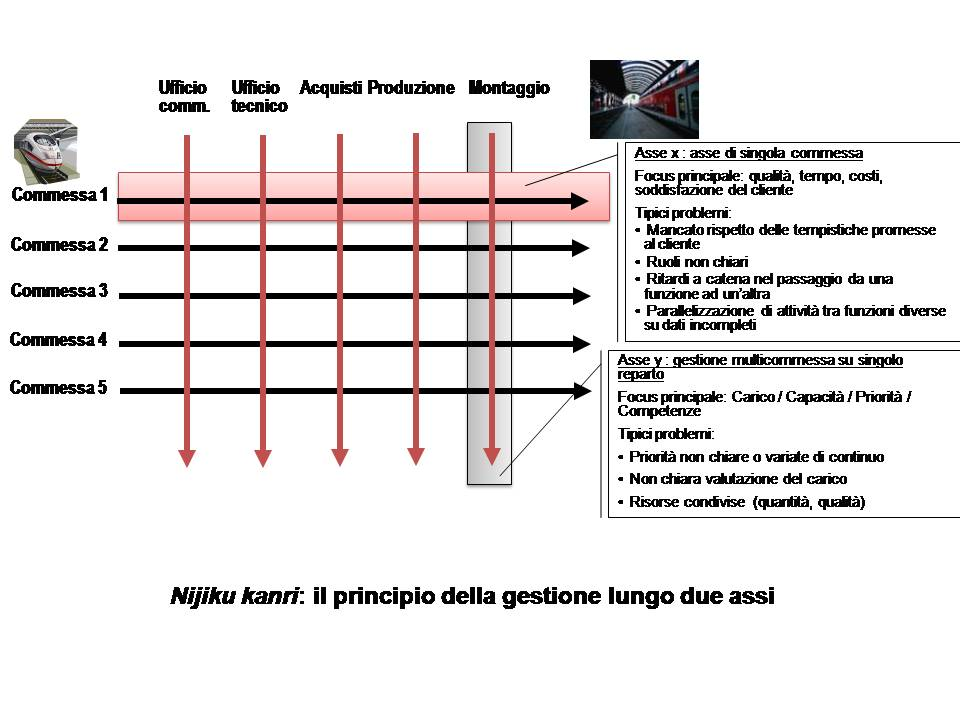
The double perspective of the setsuban kanri management approach

a. the X axis represents the made-to-order flow, where attention must be paid to quality, cost, time, and customer satisfaction issues per each order, throughout all work phases – from the order receipt to the delivery to customer.

b. the Y axis represents the department/function where attention should be paid in managing the load/capacity, know-how and priorities to complete all the orders which go through a single dept./function.

The targets for every order can be achieved only by managing at the same time both axes according to a production plan which allows the various production flows get synchronized one another. Actually, the current Project Management practices generally result too unbalanced on the X axis; the normal practices of production management, on the contrary, tend to focus almost exclusively to the governance of the Y axis.

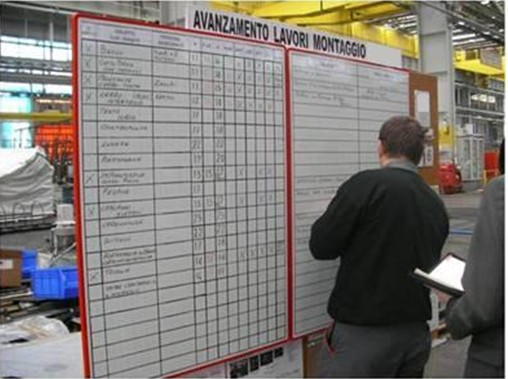
Production Control Board at a machine tool assembly plant

2. Synchronization.

It is like what happens with the Japanese railway system: the on time arrival of trains is not granted by forcing a check on each single train on the run. Instead, it is the result of careful synchronization of the entry and departure of all the trains from/to each railway station. Each train is considered with reference to the train running before and the one to follow. That is to say that the sequence can be effectively managed only by synchronizing the entire system and verifying the consistency among the drawings release plan, the supply plan and the production plan.

3. Backward planning starting from point zero.

Every single order must be planned backwards starting prom a point zero (the point after which it is no longer necessary to have processes monitored because there is a minimum risk of jamming). Choosing a reference time unit called Setsuban (can be days, weeks, decades or months), a number of time units are accounted for in the calendar and the duration of each stage in the working flow is fixed accordingly, and referred to by using delivery indicators called teban (see below).

4. The fourfold multilevel planning.

The planning system consists of 4 levels:

a. Level 0 or portfolio planning: all orders to all departments/functions

b. Level 1 or make-to-order planning: each order through all departments

c. Level 2 or department planning: all the orders with each department/function

d. Level 3 or block planning: plan by block, that is a set of activities related to every single order being realized inside a single department/function.

== Terminology ==
Workflow progress block (Suishin-ku 推進区):

A set of activities realized for a production order within the department or office where a person is clearly identified to be in charge of the correct (qualitative) completion and of meeting the production plan as well.

Reference time unit (Setsuban 節番):

The unit in which the time available is divided and the basis on which the plan is organized. For simplicity the week is generally preferred (the work shift or a period of time – e.g. 10 days – can be chosen instead).

Delivery turn (Teban手番):

The number showing the moment of time when the object planned should reach or leave a specific division or office (e.g. piece to be worked at dept. Y supposed to get in the dept. at teban 23 and to leave the same department at teban 25).

Workflow progress assistant (Shinkōin 進行員):

The person in charge of the due progress of the job /activity block in the department where the part/product is being manufactured. It is not necessarily an assigned job role, as it can be performed by the shift leader, by the head of department, by single operators or even by the in-house logistic workforce (e.g. the forklift operator).

The management system (Suishin kusei kōtei kanri 推進区制工程管理):

The true name of the organizational and managerial system and the concept the "setsuban kanri" has been referring to from its origins. The term refers to the set of processes, roles, coordination mechanisms and supporting visual tools which allow the management of processes/organizational functions by "blocks of stepping progress (advancement)".

== Tools ==
One of the founding principles of Setsuban Kanri is that the work progress control can take place only by combining to electronic tools some visual tools the use of which is the closest possible to the physical place where things happen (e.g. Assembly Dept., R&D office). Four types of tools are used:

• Tools for controlling the quality, cost, time, and customer satisfaction progress over each order for all the y axes

• Tools for managing the workload and capacity, priorities and competences through all the y axes

• Tools for synchronization and portfolio control (e.g. Portfolio plans, aggregated KPIs, etc.)

• Tools for the know-how retrieval and for the execution speed-up of each activity.

== Relationship with other methods of operations management ==
The method shares many aspects with the Lean Thinking techniques. Inspired by the Toyota Production System (TPS), it facilitates the application of the same approach to make-to-order business companies, while overcoming some of its limits. As a matter of fact, the Setsuban Kanri is adopting approaches which meet the needs of discontinuous production, high product customization and strict cross-relation among the sale, design and production phases.

== Publications ==
- (in Italian) M. Riccioni, Puntuali come treni Giapponesi, in L'IMPRESA N.5, pp. 59–61, Gruppo24Ore Publ., Milan, May 2010
- (in Italian) S.Tonchia, La guida del Sole 24Ore al Lean Office, Gruppo il Sole24 Ore, Milan March 2011
- (in Japanese) I.Tanaka, Seiban Kanri – Controlling by an order number, Publ. by JMAM, Tokyo, June 2004
- (in Japanese) I.Tanaka, Oiban Kanri – Sequence Numbering System, Publ. by JMAM, Tokyo, December 2005

== Related entries ==
- Just in time (JIT)
- Lean Production
- Muda (Japanese term)
- Akira Kōdate
- Taiichi Ohno (大野 耐一, Ohno Taiichi)
