= P-Course =

The P-Course (P stands for Production) is a practical training program about Industrial Engineering implemented to teach the main techniques for industrial work improvement (改善 "kaizen" in Japanese). Although especially aimed at applications in manufacturing, it can be useful also to transfer the core concepts of systematic improvement approach to people involved in operational activities in non-manufacturing businesses (i.e. services, indirect corporate functions).

== History ==
This course was born in Japan and was intended for production technicians, so they could best contribute to the rebirth of the manufacturing industry in the postwar period. After World War II it was necessary to reconstruct the foundations of the Japanese industrial system: in May 1946 (year 22 of the Showa era) the Japan Management Association (JMA) decided to start off a course specifically conceived for the development of those skills and knowledge required to production technicians. That was the P-Course. The training format was basically an off-site program. It was held each time in a company that would host the lessons at its shopfloor. It consisted of sessions of intensive work until late evening and it lasted one full month. Such formula was based on the scheme of a former practical course held by the Nihon Kōgyō Kyōkai (日本工業協会), which included in-depth study of operational activities and was 2 to 3 months long. The P-Course could therefore be considered a compact version of the original course offered by this body, saving as much as possible the value of the original course. The first and second edition of the P-Course (Production Course) were held at the Kōsoku Kikan Kōgyō (高速機関工業 High Speed Engine Ind.) of Shinagawa, whereas the third edition was held at Hitachi Kōki (日立工機) of Katsuta, near Mito. The first two editions were held by Mr.Ohno Tsuneo, but from the third edition onward the courses were under the responsibility of Mr. Shigeo Shingo, whose personal touch remained unequalled and yet remembered, focusing in particular on the concept of “motion mind”.

Up to 1956 a total of nineteen (19) editions were held, which allowed the training of 410 participants. This course had been created by the joint effort of JMA and the Japanese Government intending to supply the most promising enterprises with the right tools and operational know-how in order to get the maximum value by the least investment from the resources of a Country willing to go a step further the post-war reorganization. This was especially an orientation shared by an automotive company (Toyota Motor Company) which would soon become a top reference for its best practice in the management of production. Thanks to the great contribution by Mr. Taiichi Ohno – a young mechanical engineer who soon became the vice-president of Toyota – the Toyota Production System (TPS) is the approach to production engineering and organisation set in the 1950s by the said carmaker with the objective of increasing dramatically the efficiency of the company.

Based upon the Industrial Engineering principles, the TPS introduced a strongly innovative element, which turned over completely the work philosophy. The underlying statement is that «If one wants to reach success in the long run, it is not possible to separate the development of human resources from the development of the production system».

The P-Course of the first editions consisted of training sessions addressed to groups of twenty people, initially made up half by people from Toyota Motor and half by companies of the Toyota group, amongst which – for example – Denso. Mr. Taiichi Ohno adopted these training modules within Toyota. In 1955 the courses were held for those employed at the Koromo plant – the only one existing at the time. The contents of the course were essentially the first elements of Industrial Engineering. Shigeo Shingo had been in charge of the course from 1947 to 1955, for a total of about 80 courses and 3,000 trainees; from 1956 to 1958 Shingo held in Toyota one course each month. To deliver the course Shingo had one assistant, who was for a period Mr Akira Kōdate, nowadays Principal Consultant and Technical Advisor engaged in business management consulting worldwide within the JMA Group.

One of the core features of the course has been, since the beginning, the use of a training methodology based on “learning while improving” (not just as commonly referred to as "learning by doing"). That is performed by setting the activities at the shopfloor of a real factory and using that place as a classroom and the problems arising with the production of that shoploor as training material. At the time the course lasted a month, where 1/3 of theory was sided by 2/3 of practical application of the concepts learnt by theoretical explanation. Nowadays similar courses are held with the same assumptions, in a shorter lapse of time and larger classrooms, and focused on continuous improvement. one distinctive feature of the P-Course is the capability to train people quickly, fostering their ability to “see” waste (muda 無駄) and guiding people towards autonomous improvement.

This happens by pursuing two main objectives on top of others:

- The transfer of analysis and productive improvement techniques through brief theoretical sessions, focusing on the Industrial Engineering methods of analysis. The objective is to develop the ability to work out real solutions against the root causes generating critical situations / problems;
- Teaching how to realize the improvement cycle by means of practical and concrete application at the workplace (genba in Japanese).

Alternation of theoretical and practical sessions continues to be one of the distinctive and valuable features of the course.

== See also ==
- Genba
- Industrial Engineering
- Japan Management Association
- Muda
- Toyota Production System
- Shigeo Shingo

== Bibliography ==
- (in Japanese) JMAグループの原点・The DNA of JMA Group - JMA Group no genten (The origins of JMA Group), Edited by JMA Group renkei sokushin iinkai, Tokyo 2010 - pp. 34–35.
