= Shujitsu Junior College =

- 就実短期大学
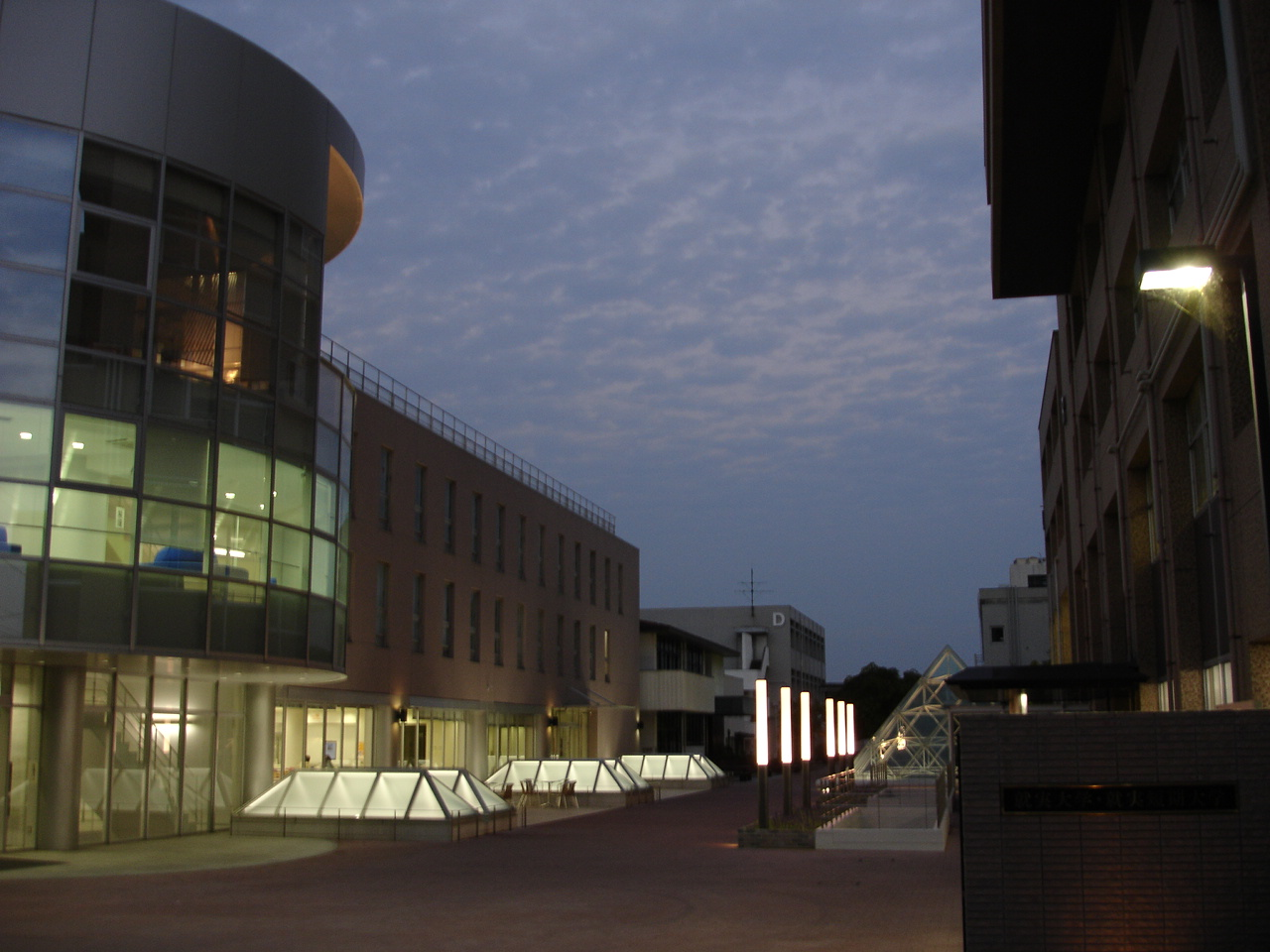
- Established: 1953
- Location: Naka-ku, Okayama, Okayama Prefecture, Japan
- Website: http://www.shujitsu.ac.jp/english/5155.html

Shujitsu Junior College (就実短期大学, Shūjitsu Tanki Daigaku) is a private junior college in Naka-ku, Okayama, Japan. It has been attached to Shujitsu University since 1979. It offers programs related to early childhood education and applied life sciences. In 2024, it and its university held a summer program to help teach Japanese to foreign students. It is owned and operated by the Shujitsu Gakuen Educational Association.
