= Akira Kōdate =

Japanese engineer and business manager (1925–2018)

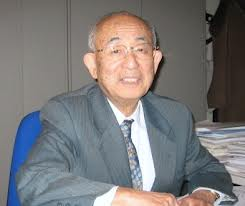
- Mr. Akira Koudate at his desk in Milan
- Born: 6 October 1925 (age 100); Kanagawa, Japan
- Died: 13 December 2018 (aged 93); Kanagawa, Japan
- Other name: Kodate sensei
- Occupations: Engineer & Management consultant
- Known for: VRP and other Management methodologies

Akira Kōdate (高達秋良、こうだて・あきら) was born in Kanagawa District, Japan on 6 October 1925. He is an engineer and a Japanese business manager, considered one of the greatest international experts in R&D and production management, as well as a master of lean thinking-related methodologies. Since 1953, he has been working as a consultant with the Japan Management Association (JMA) and JMA Consultants Inc, where he works as a principal consultant and technical advisor.

== Biography ==
Kōdate graduated in mechanical engineering from the University of Ibaragi in 1948, when postwar Japan was still recovering from World War II During university, he started working as a lathe turner operator, which gave him a solid foundation for his future endeavors.

After being in charge of production control for a while, Kōdate became a design engineer for a manufacturing company producing sawing machines and trying to emerge from the industrial void of the period. Kōdate was willing to understand how to provide a greater contribution to the recovery of Japan and improve efficiency among its workers with the limited resources available (both material and human). He sought contacts and reference literature that could fulfill his objectives and open the minds of people to the idea that work could be made easier and more effective. One of his senior colleagues suggested to him to read a book by Shigeo Shingō, which he found definitely interesting. Kōdate realized, especially, that all of the academic teaching he had received so far indulged in technical aspects, but almost no consideration had been given to notions or information referring to the way working activities were planned, done, and controlled (the PDCA or Deming Cycle); however, Shingō noted that a widespread interest for business management was arising at the same time all over the country.

In the 1950s in Japan, promising small and middle-sized companies were trying to define a growth strategy, by taking advantage of support offered by the Ministry of Industry and Trade, of which the Japan Management Association (JMA) had always been a major operational body. As a non-for-profit association of companies, the JMA offered training and consultancy, while formalizing the know-how developed by workers, and publishing manuals and papers (along with a variety of documents) for consultation and reference.

One such training courses held by JMA was the P-Course (Production Course). The P-Course aimed to pass on concepts, basic techniques, and fundamental analysis tools of industrial engineering to factory workers. (The course is still being held under the same purpose). Shigeo Shingō was the director and teacher of one of the earliest course editions, as well as subsequent editions. His assistant for a few courses was a young Akira Kōdate, who had started his new job with JMA and therefore had the opportunity to follow his senior colleague and mentor Shingo closely. As an assistant, Kōdate helped collect data, draw training material, and listen to the people attending the courses from several emerging Japanese companies. Toyota, among others, had sent some of its men to attend the classes.

After having been engaged with production control, having run several improvement projects (kaizen), and having dealt for long periods with the reorganization of business operating systems at plenty of enterprises, in the late 1950s and early 1960s Kōdate and colleagues from JMA developed knowledge and consulting approaches about productivity and efficiency in the management of product development processes. In 1960, he published the book Sekkei Kanri (The Management of Engineering), which won a prize for best technical paper of the year in Japan. The work was later published in Italian (1990) and English.

Beyond opening key concepts and methods for upgrading the design process capability in time, quality, and cost management, Kōdate developed a few extremely relevant techniques. He is known for the VRP (Variety Reduction Program)), in which variety and costs are reduced in product development. Another key product development approach by Kōdate is the henshu sekkei (cut and paste) design technique. Many techniques, including VRF, developed by Kōdate are still in use worldwide.

In the early 1980s, Kōdate stated that many business people in Western countries could feel the need and appreciate the knowledge of the contents that had been formalized in Japan to date. A number of effective techniques could be applied to Western countries and provide businesses with results similar to those in Japan in the decades after World War II and throughout the economic boom had allowed the Japanese industry to rise and prosper. Kōdate decided to move to France and offer the Japanese there his own perspective about business management. He established a permanent residence in France and worked with French companies to upgrading their management best practices. In 1988, he repeated the experience in Italy, creating the first Japanese-Italian management consulting joint venture in Milan.

Honored as Reviewer in Chief of the Master in Lean Management by the Lean Enterprise Center and the former Education Director of masters courses with other universities and business schools in Italy, Kōdate is the author of many books and articles. His works are published in Japanese, English, and Italian. Although the management of Research Development and Engineering (RD&E) is the favorite topic of his writing, Kōdate also writes about the VRF, henshu sekkei, Visible Planning, and setsuban kanri). He currently travels all over Europe, givinghim a cross-cultural awareness.

== Quotations ==
The following is a list of quotation references to books, articles, and concepts by Akira Koudate:

- Collini P., Cuel R., Fabrello L., "Sensemaking in target costing", Department of Computer Science, Verona University, Italy, 2002
- (in Italian) Tonchia S., Il Project Management – Come gestire il cambiamento e l’innovazione, Il Sole 24 Ore Publications, Milan, 2005
- (in Italian) Munari F. and Sobrero M. (eds.), "Innovazione tecnologica e gestione d’impresa – La gestione dello sviluppo prodotto", Il Mulino, 2004
- (in Italian) Lean Enterprise Center, http://www.leancenter.it/LinkClick.aspx?fileticket=WdNzCeKBgPA=&tabid=162&language=it-IT and http://www.leancenter.it/LeanEvents/LeanSummit2009/LeanSummit2009invideo/tabid/199/language/it-IT/Default.aspx October, 2009
- (in Italian) Maselli G.M., http://qualitiamo.com/articoli/Lean%20management.html (October, 2009)
- (in Italian) Simboli N., http://www.leansolutions.it/tag/koudate-akira March, 2012
- (in Italian) http://www.docstoc.com/docs/22043146/Intervista-ad-Akira-Koudate-su-Shigeo-Shingo-e-la October, 2012

== Publications ==
- Kōdate A. and Suzue T., Variety Reduction Program. A Production Strategy for Product Diversification, Productivity Press, 1990
- Smalley A., "Shingo's influence on the TPS", Superfactory, April 2006 (https://web.archive.org/web/20120630224714/http://www.superfactory.com/articles/featured/2006/0604-smalley-shingo-influence-tps.html)
- (in Italian) Kōdate A. and Suzue T., Variety Reduction Program – Una strategia di gestione della differenziazione di prodotto per la riduzione di costi legati alla varietà, ISEDI Publications, Turin, 1992
- (in Italian) Bianchi F., Kōdate A., and Shimizu T., Dall'Idea al cliente, Il Sole 24 Ore Publications, Milan, 1996
- (in Italian) Kōdate A. and Salomone F., "Supply Chain e Keiretsu: l'evoluzione verso un modello comune", Sistemi e Impresa N. 3/2001, April 2001
- (in Italian) Kōdate A., Il management della progettazione, ISEDI Publications, Turin, 2003
- (in Italian) Kōdate A. and Samaritani G., Eco-Eco management – Sinergia tra ecologia ed economia nell'impresa, Franco Angeli Publications, Milan, 2004
- (in Italian) "Intervista ad Akira Kōdate su Shigeo Shingo e la nascita del TPS", SISTEMI & IMPRESA N.10/2006, ESTE Publications, December 2006, 14–15
- (in Italian) Foreword by Kōdate A. in Volpi V., Giappone: l'identità perduta, Sperling & Kupfer, 2002
- (in Italian) Lupi C., "Imparare ad osservare per vincere le sfide – Intervista ad Akira Kōdate", SISTEMI & IMPRESA N.8, ESTE Publications, September 2008, 6–10
- (in Italian) Kōdate A., "Coraggio e libertà" ("Brave and Free"), L'IMPRESA N.4/2012, IlSole 24 Ore Publications, Milan, April 2012, 19
- (in Japanese) Kōdate A., Kankyō keiei no chōsen: Eco-Eco Manejimento no susumekata, Nihon kōgyō shinbun shinsha, Tokyo, April 2003
- (in Japanese) Kōdate A. and Pacenti G., B2B Ma-ketingu kokyaku kachi no koujou ni kōken suru nanatsu no purosesu, Diamond Publications, Tokyo, November 2000
- (in Japanese) Kōdate A., Sekkei kanri no susumekata, Nihon nōritsu kyōkai manejimento Senta Publications, Tokyo, September 1992
- (in Japanese) Kōdate A. and Suzue T., VRP: buhin hangenka keikaku – seihin tayōka jidai no seisan senryaku, Nihon nōritsu kyōkai manejimento Senta Publications, Tokyo, October 1984
