= Sanyo Gakuen University =

Coordinates: 34°38′33″N 133°56′38″E

- 山陽学園大学
- Type: Private
- Established: 1994
- Location: Naka-ku, Okayama, Japan
- Website: http://www.sguc.ac.jp

Sanyo Gakuen University (山陽学園大学, San'yō gakuen daigaku) is a private university in Okayama, Okayama, Japan. The predecessor of the school, Sanyo Eiwa Women's School, was founded in 1886, and was chartered as a junior college, Sanyo Gakuen College in 1969. The four-year college, Sanyo Gakuen University, was established in 1994.
