= Shigeo Shingo =

Japanese engineer (1909–1990)

Shigeo Shingō
- Mr. S. Shingō
- Born: 1909; Saga City, Japan
- Died: 1990 (aged 80–81); Tokyo, Japan
- Other name: Shingō dai-sensei
- Occupations: Management trainer and consultant, in Industrial engineering & Business management
- Known for: SMED, P-Course, Toyota Production System

Shigeo Shingo (新郷 重夫, Shingō Shigeo; 1909–1990) was a Japanese industrial engineer who was considered as the world’s leading expert on manufacturing practices and the Toyota Production System.

== Life and work ==
After having worked as a technician specializing in fusions at the Taiwanese railways in Taipei, at the end of the World War II, in 1945, he started to work at the Japan Management Association (JMA) (ja:日本能率協会) in Tokyo, becoming a consultant focused on the improvement of factory management. Gathering tips from the improvement experiences in the field he had in 1950 at Toyo Ind. (now Mazda) and in 1957 at the sites in Hiroshima of the Mitsubishi Heavy Industries, since 1969 Shingō got involved in some actions in Toyota Motor Corporation (Toyota) for the reduction of set-up time (change of dies) of pressing machines which took him to the formulation of a specific technique based on operational analysis, which shortened set-up times from 1 to 2 hours (or even half a day) per each exchange of dies to a rapid setting of a few minutes. The method spread out under the English denomination Single Minute Exchange of Die, abbreviated as SMED.

Shingo may well be known better in the West than in Japan, as a result of his meeting Norman Bodek, an American entrepreneur and founder of Productivity Inc. In 1981 Bodek travelled to Japan to learn about the Toyota Production System, coming across books by Shingō, who as an external consultant had been teaching Industrial engineering courses at Toyota since 1955. Since 1947, Shingō had been involved all over Japan in the training of thousands of people, who joined his courses on the fundamental techniques of analysis and improvement of the operational activities in factories (among which the P-Course, or Production Course).

Shingō had written his Study of the Toyota Production System in Japanese and had it translated into English in 1980. Bodek took as many copies of this book as he could to the USA and arranged to translate Shingo's other books into English, eventually having his original study re-translated. Bodek also brought Shingō to lecture in the USA and developed one of the first Western lean manufacturing consultancy practices with Shingō's support.

The relevance of his contribution has sometimes been doubted, but it is substantially confirmed by the opinions of his contemporaries, many saw him even as a contributor to the fundamental concepts of TPS, such as Just-in-time, and the “pull” production system, which were created by Toyota and Mr.Taiichi Ohno and still remain a strong logical and practical basis for the lean production and lean thinking management approaches. The myth prevails that Shingo invented the Toyota Production System but what can be stated is that he did document the system. Shingo contributed to the formalization of some aspects of the management philosophy known as the Toyota Production System (TPS), developed and applied in Japan since the 1950s and later implemented in a huge number of companies in the world.

In 1988, the Jon M. Huntsman School of Business at Utah State University recognized Dr. Shingō for his lifetime accomplishments and created the Shingo Prize for Operational Excellence that recognizes world-class, lean organizations and operational excellence.

The theorist of important innovations related to Industrial engineering, such as Poka-yoke and the Zero Quality Control, Shingō could influence fields other than manufacturing. For example, his concepts of SMED, mistake-proofing, and "zero quality control" (eliminating the need for inspection of results) have all been applied in the sales process engineering

Shingo was the author of several books including: A Study of the Toyota Production System; Revolution in Manufacturing: The SMED System; Zero Quality Control: Source Inspection and the Poka-yoke System; The Sayings of Shigeo Shingo: Key Strategies for Plant Improvement; Non-Stock Production: The Shingo System for Continuous Improvement and The Shingo Production Management System: Improving Process Functions.

Shigeo Shingo’s achievements were subsequently carried on by his son, Ritsuo Shingo. Through activities centered primarily in North America, the term “Kaizen” came into use in English and later spread to North America, Europe, China, and elsewhere. Today, his grandson, Kazunori Shingo (the eldest son of Ritsuo Shingo), continues that legacy.

== Education ==
- Saga Technical High School
- Yamanashi Technical College

== Bibliography ==
- Shigeo Shingo: A Revolution in Manufacturing: The Smed System, Productivity Press, 1985 (in English), ISBN 0-915299-03-8
- Shigeo Shingo: A Study of the Toyota Production System, Productivity Press, 1981 (in Japanese), 1989 (in English), ISBN 0-915299-17-8.
- Shigeo Shingo: Modern Approaches to Manufacturing Improvement: The Shingo System, Productivity Press, 1990 (in English), ISBN 0-915299-64-X
- Shigeo Shingo: Quick Changeover for Operators: The SMED System, Productivity Press, 1996 (in English), ISBN 1-56327-125-7
- Shigeo Shingo: The Sayings of Shigeo Shingo: Key Strategies for Plant Improvement, Productivity Press, 1987 (in English), ISBN 0-915299-15-1
- Shigeo Shingo: Zero Quality Control: Source Inspection and the Poka-Yoke System, Productivity Press, 1986 (in English), ISBN 0-915299-07-0
- Shigeo Shingo: Non-Stock Production: The Shingo System for Continuous Improvement, Productivity Press, 1988 (in English), ISBN 0-915299-30-5
- Shigeo Shingo: Mistake-Proofing for Operators: The ZQC System, Productivity Press, 1997 (in English), ISBN 1-56327-127-3
- Shigeo Shingo: The Shingo Production Management System: Improving Process Functions (Manufacturing & Production), Productivity Press, 1992 (in English), ISBN 0-915299-52-6
- Shigeo Shingo: Enfoques Modernos Para la Mejora En la Fabricacion: El Sistema Shingo, Productivity Press, 1992 (in Spanish), ISBN 84-87022-77-4
- Shigeo Shingo: Produccion Sin Stocks: El Sistema Shingo Para la Mejora Continua, Productivity Press, 1991 (in Spanish), ISBN 84-87022-74-X
- Shigeo Shingo: Das Erfolgsgeheimnis der Toyota-Produktion, Verlag moderne industrie, 1992 (in German), ISBN 3-478-91062-5
- Shigeo Shingo: Kaizen and The Art of Creative Thinking, Enna Product Corporation and PCS Inc, 2007 (in English), ISBN 1897363591
- Shigeo Shingo: Fundamental Principles of Lean Manufacturing, Enna Product Corporation and PCS Inc, 2009 (in English), ISBN 9781926537078

== See also ==
- Taiichi Ohno (大野 耐一, Ōno Taiichi)
- Just In Time (JIT)
- Akira Kōdate
- Shingo Prize
- Taylorism
- Toyota Production System
