= Yōji Takikawa =

Japanese specialist in science education curricula (born 1949)

滝川 洋二
- Born: 1949 (age 76–77)
- Education: Saitama University; Tokyo Gakugei University; International Christian University
- Scientific career
- Fields: Science education Science curricula
- Workplaces: International Christian University High School; University of Tokyo; Tokai University
- Doctoral advisor: Yoshinobu Kakiuchi

Yōji Takikawa (滝川 洋二, 1949–) is a Japanese pedagogist and professor at the Center for Educational Research and Development, Tokai University, specializing in science education curricula. In 1986, he organized a circle for practice in science education, which has ultimately developed into a nonprofit organization named Garireo-Kōbō (literally, Galileo Studio) with Takikawa being the chairperson of trustees.

== Biography ==
Yōji Takikawa was born in Okayama prefecture and studied at Tokyo Metropolitan Shinjuku High School. He graduated from the Department of Physics at the School of Science and Engineering, Saitama University in 1972. After completing his master's degree at Tokyo Gakugei University in 1975, he became a teacher at International Christian University High School in 1979. Takikawa completed his doctor's degree with his doctoral thesis titled "The Process of Understanding Natural Science as Seen in Class Activities: A Case Study in Mechanics".

Takikawa visited the United Kingdom from September 1999 to August 2000. He studied at a teacher's trainings course in Cambridge University. From 2006, he was a visiting professor at College of Arts and Sciences, University of Tokyo, before gaining his current position in 2010.

== See also ==
- ja:教育関係人物一覧 – List of teachers and pedagogists
- ja:理科教育 – Science education in Japan
- ja:左巻健男 – Takeo Samaki
