= Shujitsu University =

Private university in Okayama, Japan

Coordinates: 34°40′37″N 133°56′13″E

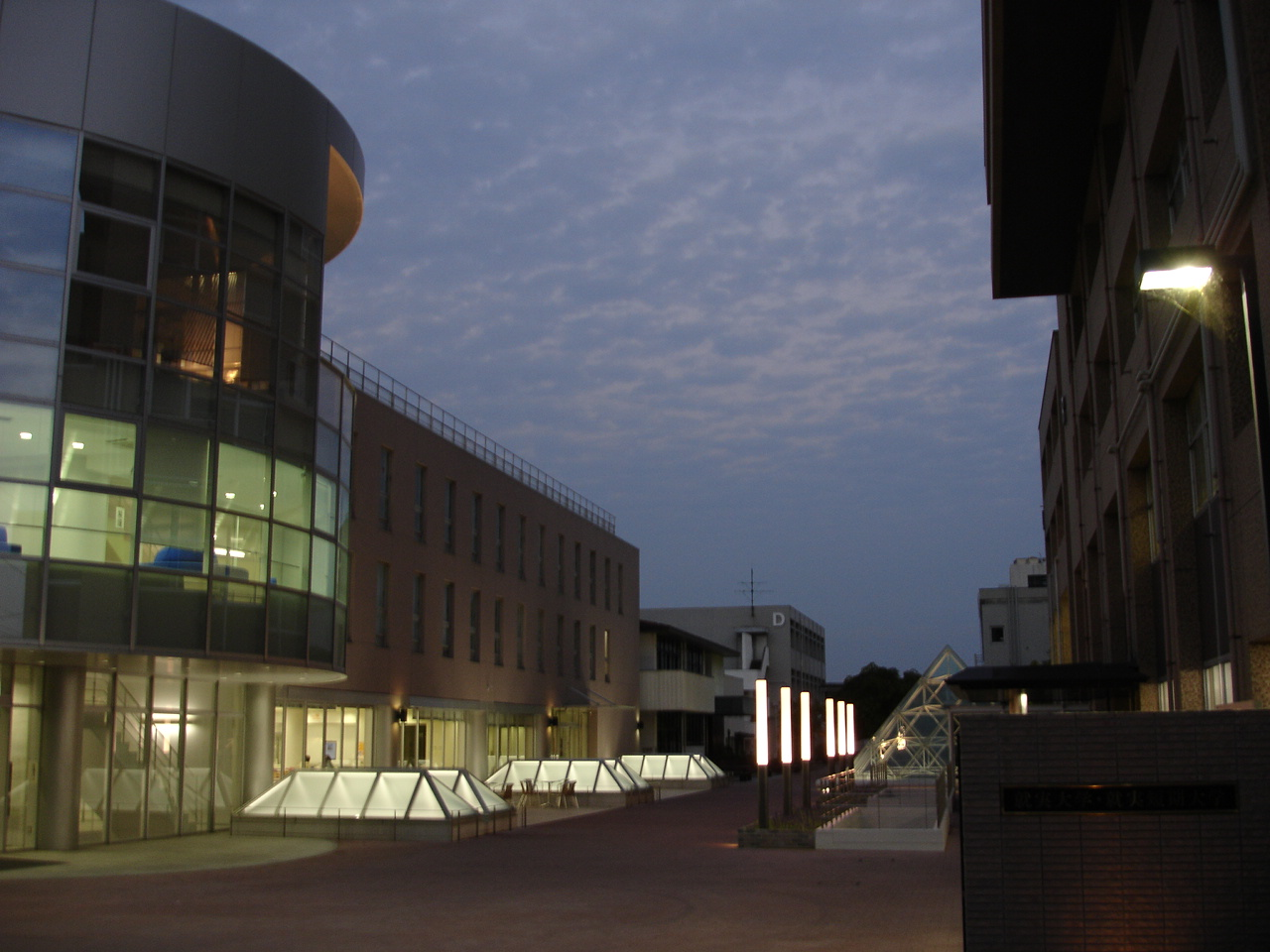
Shujitsu University

Shujitsu University (就実大学, Shūjitsu daigaku) is a private university in Okayama, Okayama, Japan. The school's predecessor, the women's school, was founded in 1904 and chartered as a junior college in 1953. In 1979, it became a four-year women's college. Adopting the present name in 2003, it became a co-ed college in 2004. It also has its own junior college, the Shujitsu Junior College. In 2024, it and its junior college held a summer program to help teach Japanese to foreign students.
