= Naka-ku, Okayama =

Ward of Okayama in Chūgoku, Japan

Coordinates: 34°40′15″N 133°56′35″E

Map

Location of Naka-ku in Okayama Prefecture

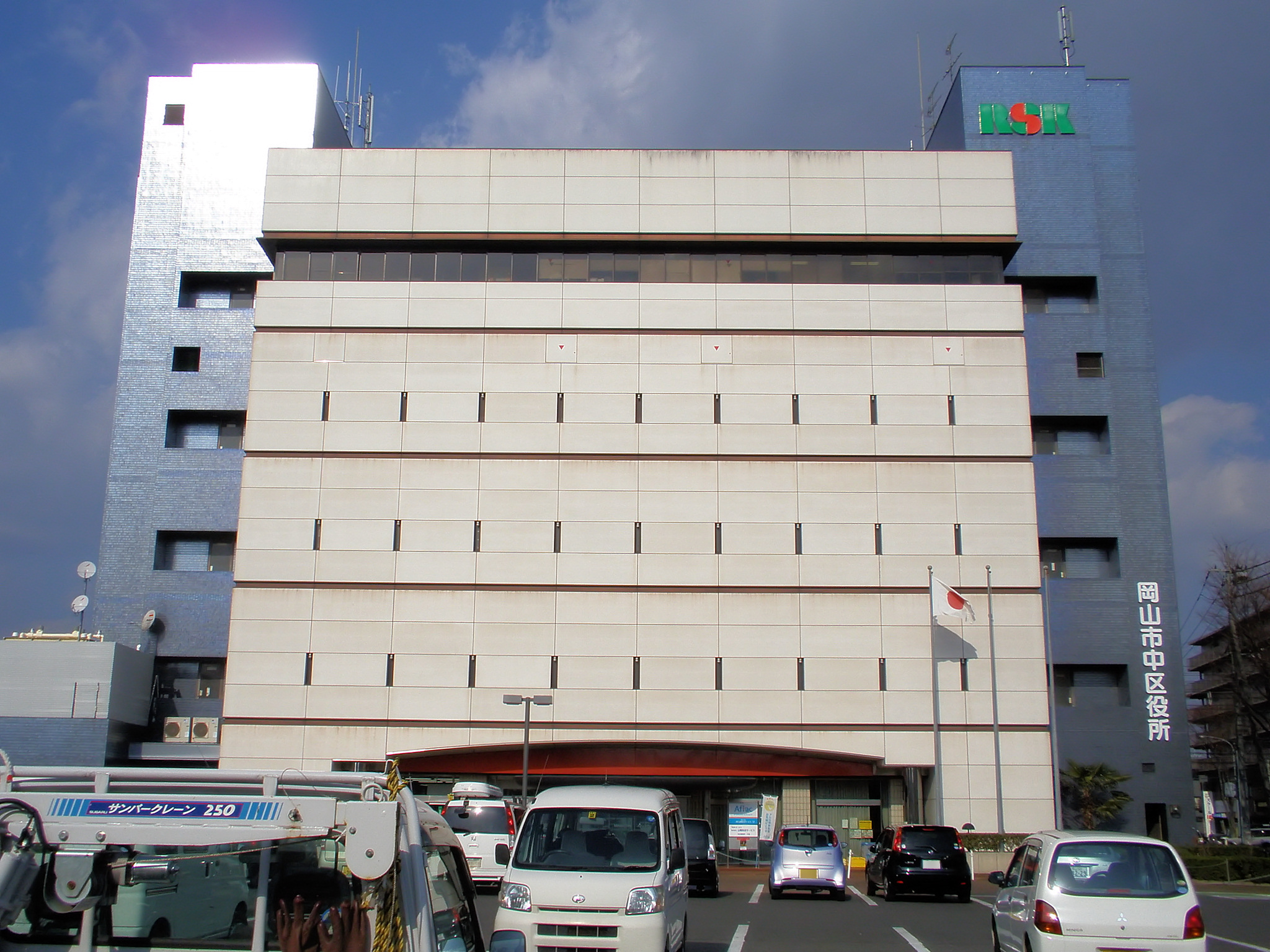
Naka ward office (RSK Media Com)

Naka-ku (中区) is one of four wards of Okayama, Okayama Prefecture, Japan. The ward has an area of 51.24 km^{2} (19.78 sq mi) and a population of 138,949. The population density is 2,711 inhabitants per square kilometer (7,020/sq mi). The name means "Central Ward." The Shujitsu Junior College is located here

The wards of Okayama were established when Okayama became a city designated by government ordinance on April 1, 2009.
