= Yoji Akao =

Yoji Akao (赤尾 洋二, Akao Yōji; 1928 – October 24, 2016) was a Japanese planning specialist recognized as the developer of Hoshin Kanri (a strategic planning methodology). With the late Shigeru Mizuno, he developed Quality Function Deployment (a group decision making technique). Akao and Mizuno also co-founded the Quality Function Deployment Institute: a non-profit organization dedicated to dissemination and advancement of QFD.

Akao received a Ph.D. in 1964 from the Tokyo Institute of Technology.

== Books ==
Akao authored or co-authored several books:

- Quality Function Deployment: Integrating Customer Requirements Into Product Design (1991)
- Hoshin Kanri: Policy Deployment for Successful TQM (Corporate Leadership) (1990)
- QFD: The Customer Driven Approach to Quality Planning and Deployment (co-authored with Shigeru Mizuno) (1994)

== Awards ==
- Deming Prize: 1978
- Quality Control Literature Prize: 1960 and 1978
