= Hoshin Kanri =

Strategic planning process

Hoshin Kanri (Japanese: 方針管理, "policy management") is a 7-step process used in strategic planning in which strategic goals are communicated throughout the company and then put into action. The Hoshin Kanri strategic planning system originated from post-war Japan, but has since spread to the U.S. and around the world. Translated from Japanese, Hoshin Kanri aptly means "compass management". The individual words "hoshin" and "kanri" mean direction and administration, respectively.

== Overview ==
Hoshin Kanri requires a strategic vision in order to succeed. From there, strategic objectives need to be clearly defined, with goals being written for long periods of a one to five-year-long timeframe. Once the long term timeframe goals are completed, the team can focus on yearly objectives. Management needs to avoid picking too many vital goals in order to stay focused on what is strategically important. The big goals then need to be broken down into smaller goals, at a weekly and monthly basis and then implemented so that everyone, from management to the factory floor, is in agreement on what needs to be accomplished. The satisfaction of goals should be reviewed on a monthly basis, with a larger annual review at the end of the year. Performance measurement is also a key part of the process.

Hoshin Kanri is a top-down approach, with the goals being mandated by management and the implementation being performed by employees. As a result, systems need to be in place to ensure that objectives from senior management are effectively communicated all the way down the chain of command. As such, a catchball system is often used in order to aid in the execution of the strategic plan. A catchball system seeks to get opinions of both managers and employees through meetings and interactions in order to ensure the bidirectional flow of goals, feedback, and other information throughout the organization.

== Usage ==
Companies that use Hoshin Kanri often follow a Think, Plan, Implement, and Review process, which is comparable to W. Edwards Deming's Plan Do Check Act cycle. This is because Deming played a role in the spreading of quality control principles that influenced the development of Hoshin Kanri. The cyclical process is a way to plan for the future, not just to react to what is happening now. The principles of PDCA are heavily embedded into the Hoshin Kanri planning process. Beyond PDCA, Joseph M. Juran also played a role in spreading quality control principles that influenced Hoshin Kanri, specifically focusing on management's role in the process.

The Hoshin Kanri technique is often aided with a Hoshin Kanri Matrix, on which companies list and align their various-length objectives and goals. The matrix can also incorporate Key Performance Indicators and priority values and be accompanied by detailed plans, resource assignment demands, or value stream maps.
