= Employee motivation =

Drive to work

Employee motivation is an intrinsic and internal drive to put forth the necessary effort and action towards work-related activities. It has been broadly defined as the "psychological forces that determine the direction of a person's behavior in an organisation, a person's level of effort and a person's level of persistence". Also, "Motivation can be thought of as the willingness to expend energy to achieve a goal or a reward. Motivation at work has been defined as 'the sum of the processes that influence the arousal, direction, and maintenance of behaviors relevant to work settings'." Motivated employees are essential to the success of an organization as motivated employees are generally more productive at the work place.

== Motivational techniques ==
Motivation is the impulse that an individual has in a job or activity to reaching an end goal. There are multiple theories of how best to motivate workers, but all agree that a well-motivated work force means a more productive work force.

=== Taylorism ===
Fredrick Winslow Taylor was one of the first theorist to attempt to understand employee motivation. His theory of scientific management, also referred to as Taylorism, analyzes the productivity of the workforce. Taylor's basic theory of motivation, is that workers are motivated by money. He viewed employees not as individuals, but as pieces of a larger workforce; in doing so his theory stresses that giving employee's individual tasks, supplying them with the best tools and paying them based on their productivity was the best way to motivate them. Taylor's theory developed in the late 1890s and can still be seen today in industrial engineering and manufacturing industries.

=== Hawthorne effect ===
In the mid-1920s another theorist, Elton Mayo along with Fritz Roethlisberger and William Dickson from the Harvard Business School, began studying the workforce. His study of the Hawthorne Works, lead him to his discovery of the Hawthorne effect. The Hawthorne effect is the idea that people change their behavior as a reaction to being observed. Mayo found that employee's productivity increased when they knew they were being watched. He also found that employees were more motivated when they were allowed to give input on their working conditions and that input was valued. Mayo's research and motivational theories were the start of the Human Relations school of management.

However, today there are studies and systematic reviews are conducted to find out whether the Hawthorne effect exists and the level of impact it can make under certain conditions.

=== Gratitude in advance ===
Thanking employees can help them, especially if done before they engage in difficult or distressing tasks. A study conducted in 2024 showed that gratitude can help increase employees' sense of social worth regarding themselves, which helps them to persist challenges more effectively than if the gratitude is expressed after the task.

== Job design ==
The design of an employee's job can have a significant effect on their job motivation. Job design includes designing jobs that create both a challenging and interesting task for the employee and is effective and efficient for getting the job done. Four approaches to job design are:

1. Job Simplification: The goal of this job design approach is to standardize and specialize tasks. This approach does not always lead to increased motivation because the jobs can become mundane over time.
2. Job Enlargement: The goal of this job design approach is to combine tasks to give the employee a greater variety of work.
3. Job Rotation: The goal of this job design approach is to move workers to different tasks periodically.
4. Job Enrichment: The key to job design employee motivation, this approach aims to enhance the actual job by building up the employee through motivational factors.

Several studies validate the effectiveness of using job design techniques to increase employee motivation. A study conducted by Campion and Thayer used a job design questionnaire to determine how job designs fostering motivation affected employees. Campion and Thayer found that jobs with more motivational features have lower effort requirements, a better well-being, and fewer health complaints. The study also found that jobs scoring high on the motivational subscale of the questionnaire contained employees who were more satisfied and motivated, had a higher rating pertaining to job performance, and had fewer absences. Hackman. conducted a study pertaining to work redesign and how redesigning work could improve productivity and motivation through job enlargement or enrichment. The study's results found that redesigning a job can improve the quality of the product or service that is provided, increase the quantity of work, and can increase work satisfaction and motivation. The last study on job design was conducted by Dunham, who wanted to determine if there was a relationship between job design characteristics and job ability and compensation requirements. Dunham believed organizations were overlooking job ability requirements and compensation when they enlarged or enriched employee's jobs. The study found that organizations were not taking into account the increased job ability requirements that job enrichments or enlargements entail nor were the organizations increasing compensation for employees who were given extra tasks and/or more complex tasks.

=== Rewards ===
Using rewards as motivators divides employee motivation into two categories: intrinsic and extrinsic motivation. Intrinsic rewards are internal, psychological rewards such as a sense of accomplishment or doing something because it makes one feel good. Extrinsic rewards are rewards that other people give to you such as a money, compliments, bonuses, or trophies. This applies to Douglas McGregor's Scientific Theory that formed Theory X, which applies to the extrinsic wants of employees. The basis for the motivation is supervision structure and money. Scientific Theory is based on the grounds that employees don't want to work so they have to be forced to do their job, and enticed with monetary compensation.Theory Y, also derived from McGregor's theory, says that employees are motivated by intrinsic or personal reward. With this theory different factors can be used to heighten the intrinsic benefit that employees are receiving at their job."

Many studies have been conducted concerning how motivation is affected by rewards resulting in conflicting and inconsistent outcomes. Pierce, Cameron, Banko, and So conducted a study to examine how extrinsic rewards affect people's intrinsic motivation when the rewards are based on increasingly higher performance criteria. Pierce et al. found that rewarding people for meeting a graded level of performance, which got increasingly more difficult, spent more time on the study's activities and experienced an increase in intrinsic motivation. Participants who were not rewarded at all or only rewarded for maintaining a constant level of performance experienced less intrinsic motivation. Another study that examined the effects of extrinsic rewards on intrinsic motivation was conducted by Wiersma. Wiersma conducted a meta-analysis to summarize the inconsistent results of past studies. The meta-analysis by Wiersma concluded that when extrinsic rewards are given by chance, they reduce intrinsic motivation. This result is supported when task behavior is measured during a free-time period. However, it is not supported when task performance is measured when the extrinsic reward is in effect. Wiersma also found that these results cannot be generalized to all situations. A study conducted by Earn also examined the effects of extrinsic rewards on intrinsic motivation. Earn wanted to know if extrinsic rewards affected a person's intrinsic motivation based on the subject's locus of control. Earn found that pay increases decreased intrinsic motivation for subjects with an external locus of control whereas pay increases increased intrinsic motivation for subjects with an internal locus of control. The study also found that when the controlling aspect of the extrinsic reward was made pertinent by making pay dependent on a certain amount of performance, higher pay undermined the intrinsic motivation of subjects and their locus of control was not relevant.

==== Intrinsic rewards: Job Characteristics Model ====
The Job Characteristics Model (JCM), as designed by Hackman and Oldham attempts to use job design to improve employee intrinsic motivation. They show that any job can be described in terms of five key job characteristics:

1. Skill Variety - the degree to which the job requires the use of different skills and talents
2. Task Identity - the degree to which the job has contributed to a clearly identifiable larger project
3. Task Significance - the degree to which the job affects the lives or work of other people
4. Autonomy - the degree to which the employee has independence, freedom and discretion in carrying out the job
5. Task Feedback - the degree to which the employee is provided with clear, specific, detailed, actionable information about the effectiveness of his or her job performance

The JCM links the core job dimensions listed above to critical psychological states which results in increased employee intrinsic motivation. This forms the basis of this "employee growth-need strength." The core dimensions listed above can be combined into a single predictive index, called the Motivating Potential Score.

=== Employee participation ===
1. Increase employee participation by implementing quality control "circles". Quality control circles involve a group of five to ten problem solving employees that come together to solve work-related problems such as reducing costs, solving quality problems, and improving production methods. Other benefits from quality control circles include an improved employee-management relationship, increased individual commitment, and more opportunities for employee expression and self-development.

A study by Marks et al. focused on assessing the effect that quality circles had on participating employees and found that the attitudes of employees who participated in quality circles were influenced in the areas concerning participation, decision making, and group communication. Although group communication was influenced, communication through the organization as a whole was not and neither was employee's personal responsibility for their work. The results of this study suggest that quality circles can provide employees with informational and social support that can help increase their motivation.

2. Increase motivation through employee participation by using open-book management. Open-book management is when a company shares important financial data with employees. Sharing the information empowers employees by putting trust into them. Employees become personally and meaningfully involved with the organization beyond just doing their assigned tasks, which increases their motivation and production Open book management is a four-step process. The first step involves employers sharing financial data with their employees. Employees need to know how the company, as a whole, is doing financially. Next, employers must teach their employees how to read and interpret the financial data. Employees can look at all the data a company gives them; however, to understand the data, they must know how to interpret the numbers. Third, employees have to be empowered to make necessary changes and decisions for the success of the organization. Employers should treat their employees like partners to promote increased employee motivation. The last step involves employers paying their employees a fair share of profits through bonuses and incentives. Bonus numbers must be attached to numbers that employees see regularly and can influence the financial data. With these steps in mind, the friction between employees and between employee/management can be drastically reduced.

Four factors must exist for any employee participation program to be successful:

- Have a profit-sharing or gain-sharing plan where both the employer and employee benefit
- Implement a long-term employment relationship to instill job security
- Make a concerted effort to build and maintain group cohesiveness
- Provide protection of the individual employee's rights

"Work motivation is a set of energetic forces that originate both within as well as beyond an individual's being, to initiate work-related behavior and to determine its form, direction, intensity, and duration" (Pinder, 1998, p. 11).

=== Quality-of-work-life programs ===
Work-life balance is an employee's perception of how a proper balance between personal time, family care, and work are maintained with minimal conflict. Employers can use work-life balance as a motivational technique by implementing quality-of-work-life programs. Examples of such programs include flextime, workplace wellness, and family support. Flexible work schedules can allow an employee to work whenever they can as long as a certain number of hours are worked each week and some employers allow their employees to work from home. Sometimes employers utilize flextime schedules that allow employees to arrive to work when they choose within specified limits. A wellness program can involve having an exercise facility, offering counseling, or even having programs set up to help employees lose weight or stop smoking cigarettes. Family support programs involve help with parenting, childcare, and some programs allow employees to leave for family purposes.

One study found that men often identify themselves with their career and work roles while women often identified themselves with the roles of mother, wife, friend, and daughter. The Sloan Foundation found that even though women enjoy working as much as men, women prefer to work nights and weekends if time needs to be made up instead of cutting their hours. A study conducted by the Alliance for Work-Life Progress surveyed employees to find out the type of workplace flexibility employees say they would like to use in the following year. Burrus et al. found that 71 percent of people want an occasional opportunity to adjust their schedule, 57 percent want to work from a location other than their office, 73 percent want to make their work-life flexibility arrangement official, and 12 percent want to work fewer hours.

Employee Engagement

A motivated employee becomes engaged in their workplace. Employee engagement is an important part of an organization's success. Research has found that organizations with engaged employees have three times higher profit margins compared to organizations with disengaged employees. Shareholder returns, operating income, and revenue growth have also had higher financial performance in employee engaged organizations. In addition, employee engagement is linked to lower absenteeism within an organization. Employers who practice employee motivation and engagement techniques in their organization will likely see an increase in overall business performance.

== Motivational theories ==
=== Maslow's hierarchy of needs ===
Abraham Maslow viewed motivation as being based on a hierarchy of needs, of which a person cannot move to the next level of needs without satisfying the previous level. Maslow's hierarchy starts at the lowest level of needs, basic physiological needs. Basic physiological needs include air, water, and food. Employers who pay at least a minimal living wage will meet these basic employee needs The next level of needs is referred to as safety and security needs. This level includes needs such as having a place to live and knowing one is safe. Employers can meet these needs by ensuring employees are safe from physical, verbal and/or emotional hazards and have a sense of job security. The third level of needs is social affiliation and belonging. This is the need to be social, have friends, and feel like one belongs and is loved. Implementing employee participation programs can help fulfill the need to belong. Rewards such as acknowledging an employee's contributions can also satisfy these social and love needs. The fourth level on the hierarchy is esteem needs. This level is described as feeling good about one's self and knowing that their life is meaningful, valuable, and has a purpose. Employers should use the job design technique to create jobs that are important to and cherished by the employee. These first four needs, Maslow called D-Needs (deficient).

The last level Maslow described is called self-actualization. Maslow called this the B-Need (being). This level refers to people reaching their potential states of well-being. An employer who ensures that an employee is in the right job and has all other needs met will help the employee realize this highest need. "Maslow further expanded self-actualization into four needs: cognitive, aesthetic, self-actualization, and self-transcendence."

=== Herzberg's two-factor theory ===
Frederick Herzberg developed the two-factor theory of motivation based on satisfiers and dissatisfiers. Satisfiers are motivators associated with job satisfaction while dissatisfiers are motivators associated with hygiene or maintenance. Satisfiers include achievement, responsibility, advancement, and recognition. Satisfiers are all intrinsic motivators that are directly related to rewards attainable from work performance and even the nature of the work itself. Dissatisfiers are extrinsic motivators based on the work environment, and include a company's policies and administration such as supervision, peers, working conditions, and salary. Herzberg believed providing for hygiene and maintenance needs could prevent dissatisfaction but not contribute to satisfaction. Herzberg also believed that satisfiers hold the greatest potential for increased work performance. Work-life programs are a form of satisfier that recognizes the employee's life outside of work which, in turn, helps motivate the employee. Improving a job to make it more interesting can improve the overall satisfaction an employee is experiencing on the job. A dissatisfier looked at by employees is how relationships form with colleagues. Colleagues play an important role of the workplace as they are all interacting daily. Forming high quality relationships with peers can extrinsically improve employee motivation.

=== Vroom's expectancy theory ===
The expectancy theory of motivation was established by Victor Vroom with the belief that motivation is based on the expectation of desired outcomes. The theory is based on four concepts: valence, expectancy, instrumentality and force. Valence is the attractiveness of potential rewards, outcomes, or incentives. Expectancy is a person's belief that they will or will not be able to reach the desired outcome. Instrumentality is the belief that a strong performance will be well rewarded. Force is a person's motivation to perform. In general, people will work hard when they think that it is likely to lead to desired organizational rewards. Vroom thought that people are motivated to work toward a goal if they believe the goal is worthwhile and if they perceive that their efforts will contribute to the achievement of that goal.

Force = Valence x Expectancy x Instrumentality

=== Locke's goal theory ===
As Human Relations management took hold, increasing intrinsic motivation and attending to individuals became a larger concern for employers. Increasing intrinsic motivation could be achieved through the Goal Setting Theory by Edwin A. Locke. Employers that set realistic and challenging goals for their employees create employee motivation. By allowing employees to engage in their job, and achieve satisfaction when reaching a goal it can entice them to want to keep setting new goals to reach new successes and yield superior performance. The theory is logical because employees are going to set more difficult goals but the goals will be attainable with increased effort. Once in the pattern of setting goals, employees can also develop goal commitment, where they are more likely to stick to jobs until they are finished.

Employees that work alongside their employers in the goal-setting process have the intrinsic benefit of participating in decisions, which can lead to higher motivation as they are empowered in their workplace. As employees reach these personally set goals, management can reinforce those efforts by showing recognition toward their success.

=== Locke and Latham's five goal setting principles ===
Dr. Gary Latham collaborated with Edwin Locke to expand upon his goal setting theory of motivation with five key principles designed to motivate the accomplishment and completion of a particular objective. These five key principles align closely around the SMART goal setting strategy designed to define objectivity and achievability. The five key principles are:

1. Clarity: Clear goals are measurable and not ambiguous which gives clear definition as to the expectations of the objective.
2. Challenge: People are often motivated by the anticipated significance upon successful completion of the particular task.
3. Commitment: There is a direct correlation between employees motivation to complete an objective and their involvement in establishing the goal and its boundaries.
4. Feedback: Consistent feedback during the objective completion process provides clarity of expectations, ability to adjust difficulty, and the opportunity to gain recognition.
5. Complexity: People in a highly demanding environment typically already have a high level of motivation, but it is important that the goal does not overwhelm the individual to maintain motivation

Integration of Conventional with Islamic Theories

The integration of Western management theories with Islamic principles, specifically the Maqasid Shariah, for employee motivation involves harmonizing individual rights and dignity with Islamic values. This synergy emphasizes social justice, fair treatment, continuous learning, and ethical leadership. By aligning professional development, teamwork, intrinsic motivation, work-life balance, and recognition with Islamic objectives, organizations can cultivate a workplace that not only prioritizes individual well-being but also upholds broader societal and moral dimensions, fostering motivation in accordance with Islamic principles. As a result, Abdullah et al. (2023) has developed a unique employee motivation index by fusing McClelland and Maqasid Shariah in their studies.

== See also ==
- Work motivation
- Suggestion system
- Employee offboarding
