= Project production management =

Management method for production projects

Project production management (PPM) is the application of operations management to the delivery of capital projects. The PPM framework is based on a project as a production system view, in which a project transforms inputs (raw materials, information, labor, plant & machinery) into outputs (goods and services).

The knowledge that forms the basis of PPM originated in the discipline of industrial engineering during the Industrial Revolution. During this time, industrial engineering matured and then found application in many areas such as military planning and logistics for both the First and Second World Wars and manufacturing systems. As a coherent body of knowledge began to form, industrial engineering evolved into various scientific disciplines including operations research, operations management and queueing theory, amongst other areas of focus. Project Production Management (PPM) is the application of this body of knowledge to the delivery of capital projects.

Project management, as defined by the Project Management Institute, specifically excludes operations management from its body of knowledge, on the basis that projects are temporary endeavors with a beginning and an end, whereas operations refer to activities that are either ongoing or repetitive. However, by looking at a large capital project as a production system, such as what is encountered in construction, it is possible to apply the theory and associated technical frameworks from operations research, industrial engineering and queuing theory to optimize, plan, control and improve project performance.

For example, Project Production Management applies tools and techniques typically used in manufacturing management, such as described by Philip M. Morse in, or in Factory Physics to assess the impact of variability and inventory on project performance. Although any variability in a production system degrades its performance, by understanding which variability is detrimental to the business and which is beneficial, steps can be implemented to reduce detrimental variability. After mitigation steps are put in place, the impact of any residual variability can be addressed by allocating buffers at select points in the project production system – a combination of capacity, inventory and time.

Scientific and Engineering disciplines have contributed to many mathematical methods for the design and planning in project planning and scheduling, most notably linear and dynamic programming yielding techniques such as the critical path method (CPM) and the program evaluation and review technique (PERT). The application of engineering disciplines, particularly the areas of operations research, industrial engineering and queueing theory have found much application in the fields of manufacturing and factory production systems. Factory Physics is an example of where these scientific principles are described as forming a framework for manufacturing and production management. Just as Factory Physics is the application of scientific principles to construct a framework for manufacturing and production management, Project Production Management is the application of the very same operations principles to the activities in a project, covering an area that has been conventionally out of scope for project management.

== Historical background and related areas ==
Modern project management theory and techniques started with Frederick Taylor and Taylorism/scientific management at the beginning of the 20th century, with the advent of mass manufacturing. It was refined further in the 1950s with techniques such as critical path method (CPM) and program evaluation and review technique (PERT). Use of CPM and PERT became more common as the computer revolution progressed. As the field of project management continued to grow, the role of the project manager was created and certifying organizations such as the Project Management Institute (PMI) emerged. Modern project management has evolved into a broad variety of knowledge areas described in the Guide to the Project Management Body of Knowledge (PMBOK).

Operations management (related to the fields of production management, operations research and industrial engineering) is a field of science that emerged from the modern manufacturing industry and focuses on modeling and controlling actual work processes. The practice is based upon defining and controlling production systems, which typically consist of a series of inputs, transformational activities, inventory and outputs. Over the last 50 years, project management and operations management have been considered separate fields of study and practice.

PPM applies the theory and results of the various disciplines known as operations management, operations research, queueing theory and industrial engineering to the management and execution of projects. By viewing a project as a production system, the delivery of capital projects can be analyzed for the impact of variability. The effects of variability can be summarized by VUT equation (specifically Kingman's formula for G/G/1 queue). By using a combination of buffers – capacity, inventory and time – the impact of variability to project execution performance can be minimized.

A set of key results used to analyze and optimize the work in projects were originally articulated by Philip Morse, considered the father of operations research in the U.S. and summarized in his seminal volume. In introducing its framework for manufacturing management, Factory Physics summarizes these results:

1. A perfect world of maximum profitability and service occurs when demand and transformation (also called supply) are perfectly synchronized: all demand is met instantly at minimum cost
2. Because there is variability, demand and transformation can never be perfectly synchronized. In some cases, detrimental variability can be removed. An example would be the statistical quality control techniques used in manufacturing to control deviations, but even then, there is residual detrimental variability that causes demand and supply never to be perfectly synchronized. This leads us to:
3. Buffers are required when synchronizing demand and transformation in the presence of variability
4. There are only three buffers: capacity, inventory and time

There are key mathematical models that describe the relationships between buffers and variability. Little's law – named after academic John Little – describes the relationship between throughput, cycle time and work-in-process (WIP) or inventory. The Cycle Time Formula summarizes how much time a set of tasks at a particular point in a project take to execute. Kingman's formula, also known as the VUT equation – summarizing the impact of variability.

== Journals ==
The following academic journals publish papers pertaining to Operations Management issues:

- Management Science
- Manufacturing & Service Operations Management
- Operations Research
- International Journal of Operations & Production Management
- Production and Operations Management
- Journal of Operations Management
- Journal of Project Production Management, Project Production Institute
