= Vicky Mabin =

New Zealand management professor

- Born: 28 December 1953
- Other names: Victoria Jane Mabin; Victoria Jane van den Broek-Mabin

Academic background
- Education: Lancaster University Management School, University of Canterbury
- Thesis: Variability in distribution (1981)
- Academic advisor: Hans G. Daellenbach

Academic work
- Institutions: Victoria University of Wellington
- Doctoral students: Sarah Leberman

Victoria Jane Mabin, also van den Broek-Mabin, is a New Zealand management academic, and is a professor emeritus at Victoria University of Wellington. Mabin is a Fellow of the UK Operational Research Society and was awarded a Lifetime Achievement Award by the Theory of Constraints International Certification Organization.

== Academic career ==
Mabin completed a Bachelor of Science with Honours at the University of Canterbury in 1975, where she was a student of Hans Daellenbach. She then completed a PhD titled Variability in distribution at the Department of Operational Research at the University of Lancaster. Mabin worked at DSIR before joining the faculty of Victoria University of Wellington in 1991, rising to full professor as Professor of Management in 2012. Mabin was the Associate Dean (Teaching and Learning) for Victoria's School of Business for six years from 2008. In 2020 she retired and was made emeritus professor.

Mabin's research focused on operational research and the theory of constraints. She has served as the President of the Operations Research Society of New Zealand.

One of Mabin's notable doctoral students is Professor Sarah Leberman.

== Awards ==
In 2004 Mabin was elected a Fellow of the Operational Research Society in the UK.

In 2018 the Operations Research Society of New Zealand awarded her the Hans Daellenbach Prize, which is awarded to 'distinguished contributors' of operational research.

Mabin was part of a team of four researchers awarded the Griffiths Medal by the Operational Research Society (UK) in 2019 for the best article in the journal Health Systems in 2017–2018.

Mabin was awarded a TOCICO Lifetime Achievement Award by the Theory of Constraints International Certification Organization in 2021, "in recognition for significant contribution to the TOC community to advance the TOC body of knowledge".

== Selected works ==
- Mabin, Victoria Jane; Steven J. Balderstone (2003). "The performance of the theory of constraints methodology: Analysis and discussion of successful TOC applications". International Journal of Operations & Production Management. 23 (6): 568–595. doi:10.1108/01443570310476636. Wikidata Q130257682.
- Mabin, Victoria Jane; Steve Forgeson; Lawrence Green (2001). "Harnessing resistance: using the theory of constraints to assist change management". Journal of European Industrial Training. 25 (2/3/4): 168–191. doi:10.1108/eum0000000005446. Wikidata Q130257665.
- Mabin, Victoria Jane; Steven J. Balderstone (2020). The World of the Theory of Constraints: A Review of the International Literature. doi:10.4324/9780429273056. ISBN 978-0-429-27305-6. Wikidata Q130257692.
- Seonmin Kim; Mabin, Victoria Jane; John Davies (2008). "The theory of constraints thinking processes: retrospect and prospect". International Journal of Operations & Production Management. 28 (2): 155–184. doi:10.1108/01443570810846883. Wikidata Q56158540.
- J. Davies; Mabin, Victoria Jane; S.J. Balderstone (2005). "The theory of constraints: a methodology apart?—a comparison with selected OR/MS methodologies". OMEGA International Journal of Management Science. 33 (6): 506–524. doi:10.1016/j.omega.2004.07.015. Wikidata Q130257656.
