= Fixed position assembly =

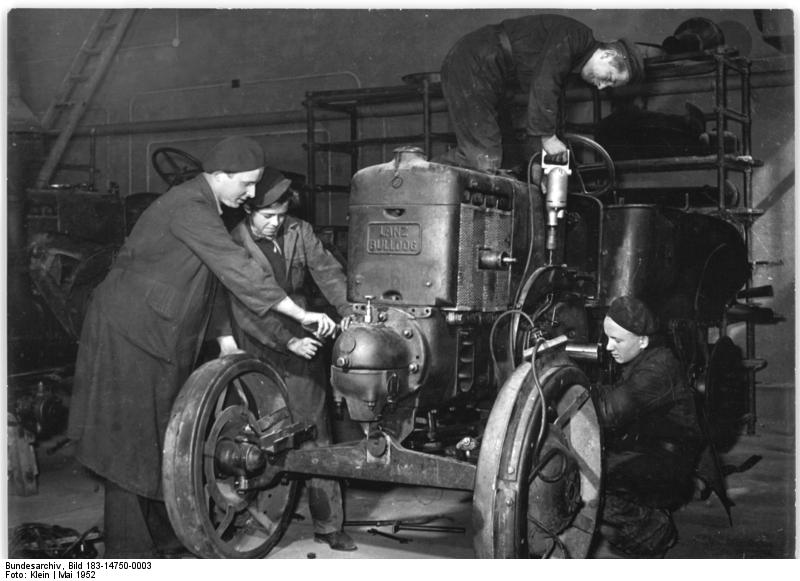
Tractor being assembled stands still, while workers and tools move to complete required operations

Fixed position assembly refers to an assembly system or situation in which the product does not move while being assembled, this configuration is usually contrasted in operations management and industrial engineering with assembly lines. Dimensioning this system is very simple: considering CP as productive capacity and T as average assembly time, then N, number of working stations, is given by N=CP*T.

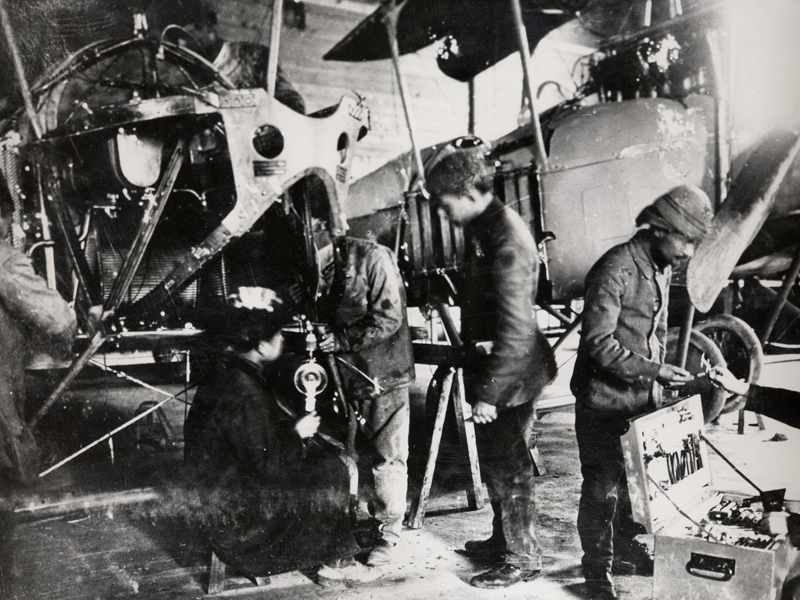
Ottoman airplane being assembled during WWI. Even though airplane assembly is often cited as an example of fixed position system, today many airplanes go through assembly lines.

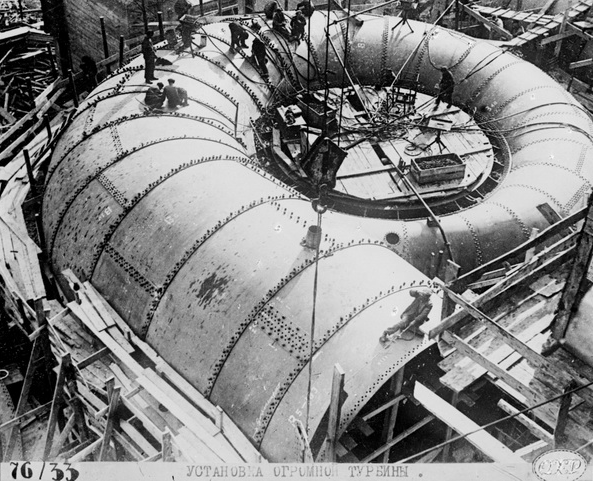
Water turbine being assembled

== Advantages ==
- high system flexibility: both in introducing new products and attaining product customization
- high variability in operations naturally lends itself to introducing job enlargement (to the benefit of the worker)
- low investment: only "capital" needed are generic worker tools.

== Disadvantages ==
- High work in progress
- Significant space occupancy
- Higher labor costs: workers need to know how to perform all operations of the technological cycle and therefore skilled labor needs to be employed (this is in sharp contrast to the assembly line in which a worker needs almost no training thanks to division of labour being carried to its extreme.

== See also ==
- Production systems
