= Journal of Operations Management =

- Discipline: Operations management
- Language: English
- Edited by: Elliot Bendoly, Rogelio Oliva

Publication details
- History: 1980–present
- Publisher: Wiley on behalf of the Association for Supply Chain Management
- Frequency: 8/year
- Open access: Hybrid
- Impact factor: 10.4 (2024)

Standard abbreviations
- ISO 4: J. Oper. Manag.

Indexing
- ISSN: 0272-6963 (print); 1873-1317 (web)
- LCCN: 84646380
- OCLC no.: 632966730

Links
- Journal homepage; Online access; Online archive; Journal page at publisher's website

The Journal of Operations Management is a peer-reviewed academic journal covering research on all aspects of operations management. It was established in 1980 and is published by Wiley on behalf of the Association for Supply Chain Management. It is listed as one of the 50 journals used by the Financial Times to compile its business-school research rankings. The editors-in-chief are Elliot Bendoly (Ohio State University) and Rogelio Oliva (Texas A&M University).

== Abstracting and indexing ==
The journal is abstracted and indexed in:

- Current Contents/Business Collection
- Current Contents/Engineering, Computing & Technology
- Current Contents/Social and Behavioral Sciences
- EBSCO databases
- Ei Compendex
- Inspec
- ProQuest databases
- Science Citation Index Expanded
- Scopus
- Social Sciences Citation Index

According to the Journal Citation Reports, the journal has a 2022 impact factor of 10.4.
