= Customer benefit package =

A customer benefit package (CBP) forms as a part of the operations management (OM) toolkit. It involves a clearly defined set of tangible (goods) and intangible (services) features that the customer recognizes, purchases, or uses. This can be the real or perceived value that a customer experiences or believes they are receiving through dealing with a company.

== Overview ==
A combination of a primary product with additional goods and services defines the total product to the customer. In other words, a CBP is a combination of services and goods that adds value to the primary product acquired by the customer. The primary product is the "core" offering that attracts customers and satisfies their basic needs. These goods and services adding value to the primary product are called peripheral goods and services, which are not essential to the primary product, but enhance it. Examples of peripheral goods and services in the fast food industry include toys (peripheral goods) that are offered as part of a kiddie's meal and a kids' play area (peripheral service) inside the fast food restaurant.

The CBP may also contain some variants as part of the product offering. A variant is an attribute that departs from the CBP overall theme. Adding unique goods or services like free Internet access inside the fast food restaurant gives the customer the ability to surf the Internet while enjoying a meal. Often a variant will become part of the CBP on a continuous basis, thus it becomes a permanent peripheral good or service.

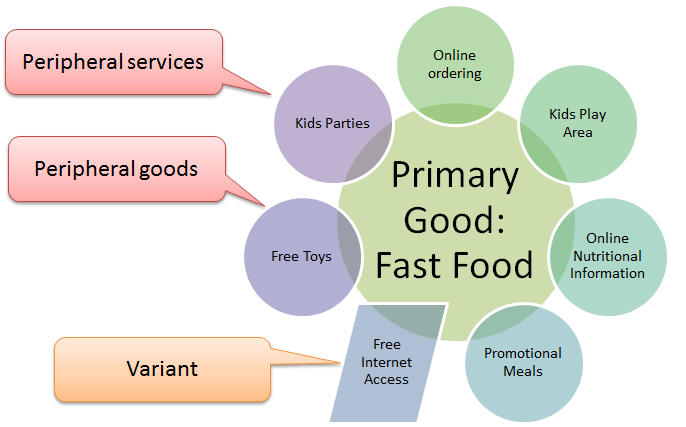
Customer benefit package

== Benefits ==
- Defines the services or products offering to the customer.
- Serves as guidelines for employees when selling the product.
- Provides a marketing and communication channel to reach the customer.

== CBP integration as part of OM ==
The CBP cannot stand on its own as a system or tool. OM requires effective management of the whole value chain starting with identifying the customer's needs and ending with supplying a final product that meets or exceeds the customer's expectations. Developing the CBP through all these stages of the value chain is essential to create and deliver a process for each peripheral good or service adding to the overall development of the final product to the customer.

== Examples ==
=== Automobile industry ===
The requirements of the customer (client) are clearly defined within a contract agreement between the contractor and the customer. However, there are a number of peripheral good and services that can be developed in this highly controlled environment. Disciples like quality management and risk management in conjunction with information technology (IT) systems and operations management (OM) processes can be used to develop systems with the ability to capture real-time data and report directly to the customer. This is just one example of many more possibilities that can differentiate a contractor from the competition.

=== Medical ===
Medicine is evolving daily; there are new cures to diseases, new vaccines and new diagnostic technology that once thought impossible. "There is however an extreme lack in incorporating information technology (IT) and OM processes within medical practices. I have therefore decided to re-evaluate the value chain within my new general practitioner (GP) practice", a South African doctor comments. Living in the information age, patients want to know everything, so much a new term "googlelitis" is used in describing many patients. Embracing this new culture (need) amongst patients can be satisfied with the use of short message service (SMS) technology to report medical results and confirm future appointments.
