= Job rotation =

Technique used by employers

Job rotation is the lateral transfer of employees between jobs in an organization without a change in their hierarchical rank or salary grade. Rotated employees usually do not remain in these jobs permanently and may also not return to former jobs. The frequency and duration of intervals in a job rotation can vary widely from daily to periods of years. The practice serves several functions including staffing, employee motivation, managing employee fatigue, employee orientation and placement, and career development.

Job rotation is used systematically by a large number of companies. This can be through structured job rotation programmes, or informally though the frequent lateral transfers that occur in organizations. Rotations are more common among lower performing staff who don’t generally achieve sizeable performance gains after a rotation. The rotation of higher performing staff is less prevalent, but has been shown to be beneficial for them with sizeable performance increases within two years of a job rotation. Most companies using job rotation have less strict attendance policies due to increased employee engagement and flexibility, while most organizations that implement job rotation focus on productivity and skill development, which can lead to more adaptive workplace policies. Rotation differs from promotion, which refers to an upward movement or rise in rank in an organizational hierarchy, usually indicated by an increase in responsibility and status and change in compensation.

Job rotation contradicts the principles of specialization and the division of labor, which suggest employees specialize in narrowly defined tasks as a way to increase productivity. It also differs from practices such as traditional craft production, where a craftsperson may perform all the tasks to produce a final product, and job enlargement where the scope of a job may be extended.

== History ==
Records show job rotation has been used by communal societies, such as the Shakers since the nineteenth century.

There is evidence that job rotation has been practiced by firms in Japan since the early 1950’s. Toyo Kogyo Company the Japanese firm that now produces Mazda automobiles, has been one such company. Toyo has used job rotation to redeploy staff during economic events, but does exclude some expert areas from their system (e.g. research and development).

Potentially due to the widespread usage of job rotation in Japan and the success of Japanese firms, interest in job rotation increased in the United States of America in the 1980s.

The concept of job rotation has also been used to develop active labor market policies. A scheme introduced in Denmark in the early 1990s supported unemployed people to rotate into the jobs of employed people, to enable them to participate in further training.

== Benefits ==
Job rotation offers numerous benefits for both organisations and employees:

=== Organisations ===
- Workforce flexibility: From an organizational perspective, job rotation promotes a more flexible workforce by allowing employees to gain experience across multiple areas. Organizations benefit from this cross-functional experience because having a more flexible, multi-skilled workforce enables employees that can be redeployed as needed. Such flexibility minimizes operational disruptions and enables organisations to respond swiftly to shifting organizational demands such as in times of employee absence or organizational change. Moreover, a flexible workforce is better equipped to innovate and solve complex problems, thereby enhancing overall effectiveness and responsiveness.
- Improved performance: As employees are exposed to different areas, it facilitates knowledge transfer and best practice sharing throughout the organisation which can lead to increased innovation and improved processes. Also, through job rotation, employees gain broader experience and develop new skills, it results in them bringing fresh perspectives and innovative ideas to their roles, which can lead to improved overall job performance and increased value to the organisation.
- Enhanced public service delivery: In the public sector, job rotation through various departments offers a holistic understanding of public service delivery. When staff members are familiar with multiple roles and departments, they can approach problems with a more comprehensive perspective, leading to more innovative and effective solutions. This holistic understanding allows employees to address public policy issues, ensuring that services are delivered more efficiently and effectively.

=== Employee ===
- Skill development: One of the primary benefits of job rotation is that it helps develop workers’ knowledge and skills within the organisation.
- Increased job satisfaction and motivation: Job rotation significantly contributes to increased job satisfaction and motivation. By introducing of new tasks and responsibilities, it provides new challenges, reduces boredom, helps prevent burnout and leads to improved staff morale. This variety helps to foster engagement and a positive work environment, improving overall job satisfaction.
- Broader organizational understanding: Job rotation provides employees with an opportunity to gain insights into the organization's diverse work.
- Career growth opportunities: As a tool for training and development, this practice fosters diverse skill-building and better prepares individuals for career advancement.
- Health and well-being: Employees in mentally demanding roles can benefit from rotating into different tasks, which helps reduce mental fatigue and stress. By varying tasks and responsibilities, job rotation can help reduce the physical and mental stress that often comes with repetitive work, contributing to a healthier and more engaged workforce.
- Employee retention: Fostering a sense of growth and value among employees can significantly impact retention. Employees who are given the opportunity to rotate through various roles often feel that their organisation is investing in their development, which encourages loyalty and reduces turnover. Providing growth opportunities internally through job rotation can also improve employee retention, as it prevents skilled workers from seeking them externally.

== Drawbacks ==
Job rotation also presents several challenges for organisations and employees:

=== Organisations ===
- Increased training resource costs: Job rotation incurs both direct and indirect costs. Direct expenses include the financial cost for training employees across other roles, while indirect costs arise from the time and resources needed for effective role transitions. During the learning phase, employees may make more errors, leading to further costs and reduced operational efficiency. Given that approximately one-third of U.S. employees and one fifth of Europe employees change jobs within a 12-month period, the costs associated with job rotation may not be justified for some organizations.
- Temporary productivity losses: Job rotation is often associated with an initial temporary reduction in productivity, as employees undergo a learning curve while transitioning into new roles. Loss of productivity occurs as employees learn new roles, transfer skills and familiarize themselves with new team dynamics. This productivity loss can affect both the department the employee is leaving and the department receiving the employee.
- Employees’ resistance to change: Employees may resist job rotation due to unfamiliar roles, anxiety or lack of motivation to learn new tasks. Some employees may feel protective of their current role, especially if they have developed expertise and derive personal satisfaction from their position. Additionally, concerns about losing skills, job stability or the perception that increased responsibilities from rotation are not adequately reflected in wages may fuel resistance.
- Decreased employee accountability: Frequent job rotations can diminish individual accountability, as employees may feel less responsible for long-term outcomes, reducing efforts and engagement. This can make it challenging for expectations to be met, leading to increased stress.
- Organizational resistance to job rotation: Implementing job rotation may face resistance from both leadership and employees. In larger or more complex organizations, where knowledge-sharing systems and job structures are more bureaucratic, the effectiveness of job rotation strategies may diminish. Additionally, resistance may also arise from organizational cultures that are reluctant to share knowledge or adapt to changes brought by job rotation.
- Factors limit the implementation of job rotation: In industries requiring highly specialized skills, such as in law or medicine, job rotation may be impractical. Additionally, the growing prevalence of artificial intelligence and automation of repetitive tasks reduces the need for job rotation in certain sectors.

=== Employees ===
- Burnout and exhaustion: Frequent or poorly managed job rotation can lead to employee exhaustion and burnout. Employees might experience mental fatigue or heighten stress from constantly having to adapt to new roles, particularly when there isn’t adequate support.
- Increased injury risk: Job rotation is often used to reduce physical strain from repetitive tasks. However evidence on its effectiveness in preventing musculoskeletal complaints is contradictory and open to interpretation. Rotating employees into jobs with a high risk of injury can increase the overall risk of workplace injuries. Insufficient training or rotating unskilled workers into more physical or mentally demanding roles may further elevate the risk of injury.
- Reduced expertise and role clarity: Frequent job rotation can hinder employees from developing deep expertise in one area, creating confusion about employee’s individual roles and responsibilities. This reduction in task specialization can lower productivity and reduce product quality.
- Increased job dissatisfaction and slowed career growth: Job rotation can make it challenging for managers to assess individual’s long-term contributions and skill developments, potentially limiting recognition and slowing career progression. Employees may feel overlooked, leading to increased job dissatisfaction.

== See also ==
- Job crafting
- Job enlargement
- Job satisfaction
- Division of labor
