= Resource profit model =

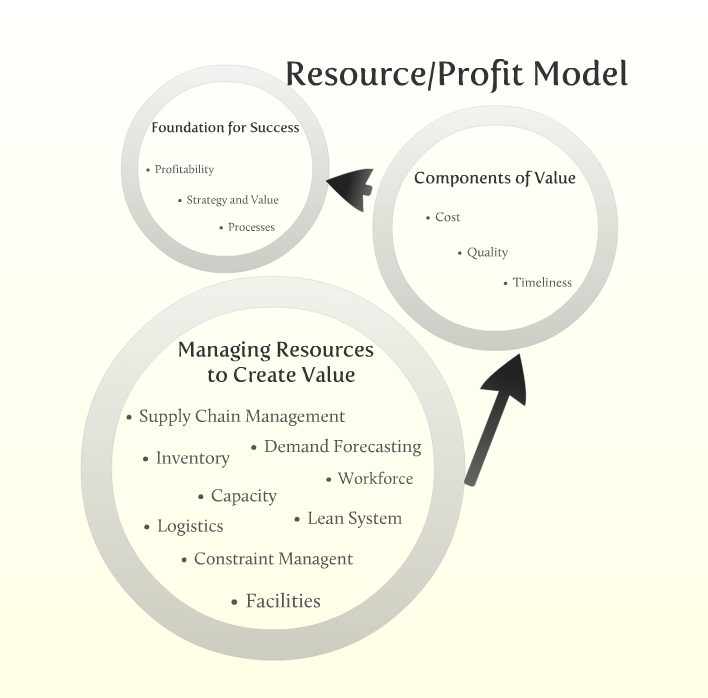
Interdependencies of components within the resource/profit model

The resource/profit model is a framework that illustrates the most important elements of operations management within a business environment. This structured approach of Byron J. Finch shows three major components of operations management (foundation for success, components of value and managing resources to create value) and how they relate to each other. When all elements consort well with each other, it will consequently lead to a financial success of a business.

== Foundation for success ==
The three fundamental criteria for successful organizations consist of profitability, strategy and value as well as processes. Profitability, as a fundamental goal of each profit oriented organization, depends on an elaborated strategy to provide a real value for customers. In the long run, this will also pay off for the organization due to loyal and less price sensitive customers. To be able to achieve set objectives and to meet customer expectations, it is necessary to continuously monitor and improve processes to enhance efficiency and thus maintaining one's competitive advantage.

== Components of value ==
Value is determined by costs, quality and timeliness. An organization needs to provide at least two of these components to provide value to customers. An organization that offers high quality for low costs can be successful even if the delivery time of its products or services is not timely. Also the combination of low costs and timeliness can meet the requirements of some customers, even though the quality is not meeting the standard of competitors. In the premium sector, quality and timeliness are the most important criteria. Higher costs will be accepted in order to have these benefits.

In the end, value is what the customer perceives as valuable. Therefore, an organization needs to know what their customers are looking for.

== Managing resources to create value ==
Resources are the basics an organization is working with. The appropriate use of resources adds value to a product or service. In other words, the process between input and output needs to add value to ensure profitability. According to the resource profit model, the process involves the following nine areas:

- Supply chain management
- Demand forecasting
- Inventory
- Logistics
- Lean systems
- Capacity
- Constraint management
- Facilities
- Workforce
