= Sarah Leberman =

New Zealand sport management academic

Sarah Leberman MNZM
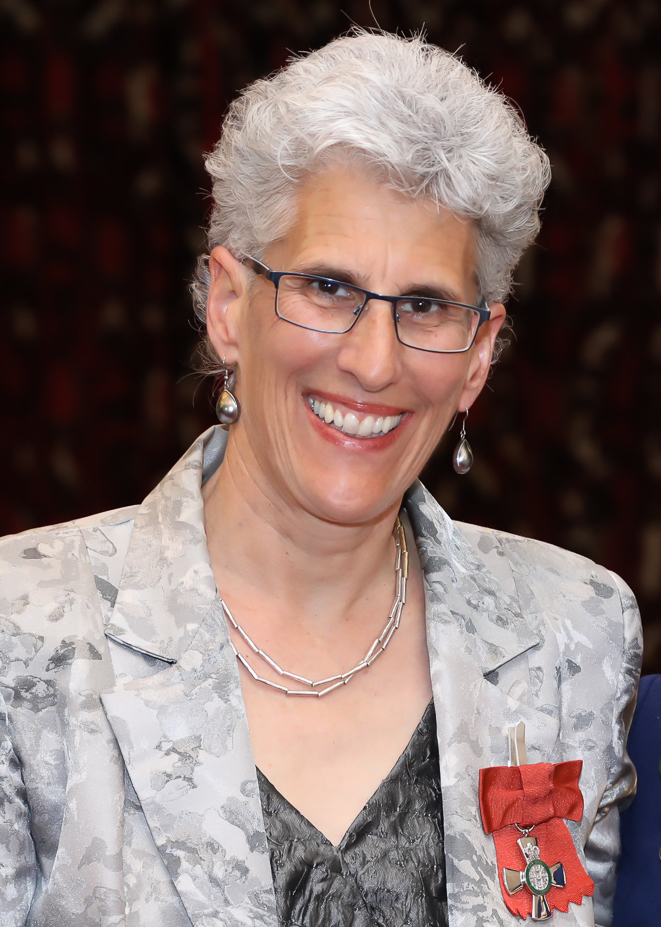
- Leberman in 2020
- Education: Victoria University of Wellington
- Scientific career
- Fields: Sport management
- Workplaces: Massey University
- Thesis: The transfer of learning from the classroom to the workplace : a New Zealand case study (1999)
- Doctoral advisor: Vicky Mabin

Sarah Isabella Leberman MNZM is a New Zealand sport management academic, as of 2012 is a full professor at the Massey University.

== Academic career ==
After a 1999 PhD titled 'The transfer of learning from the classroom to the workplace: a New Zealand case study ' at the Victoria University of Wellington, Leberman moved to the Massey University, rising to full professor.

== Awards and honours ==
In 2019, Leberman won the NEXT Woman of the Year in the Sport category.

In the 2020 Queen's Birthday Honours, Leberman was appointed a Member of the New Zealand Order of Merit, for services to women, sport and tertiary education.

In 2020 Leberman received the Zonta New Zealand Woman of the Biennium Award.

== Selected works ==
=== Books ===
1. Leberman, Sarah, and Lex McDonald. The transfer of learning: Participants' perspectives of adult education and training. Routledge, 2016

=== Peer reviewed journal articles ===
For up to date publication list refer to https://www.researchgate.net/profile/Sarah_Leberman
