= Elliot Bendoly =

American academic (born 1974)

- Born: 1974; Cleveland, Ohio
- Occupations: Academic, author

Academic background
- Education: Case Western Reserve University, Indiana University

Academic work
- Institutions: Ohio State University, Emory University
- Main interests: Operations Management, Human Behavior, Technology Use
- Notable works: Excel Basics to Blackbelt; Handbook of Behavioral Operations Management; Visual Analytics for Management
- Notable ideas: OUtCoMES Cycle

Elliot Bendoly (born December 4, 1974, in Cleveland, Ohio) is an American professor of management science at the Fisher College of Business at Ohio State University notable for his work in operations management and collaborations with scholars in management and psychology with economics expert Rachel Croson, Susan Helper and David Levine, as well as system dynamics expert John Sterman. He has served as associate dean for Fisher’s undergraduate program and co-academic director of its Specialized Master in Business Analytics.

== Career ==
A graduate of the Kelley School of Business at Indiana University Bloomington and Case Western Reserve University, Bendoly was on the faculty of Emory University in Atlanta, prior to joining Ohio State University. He is a senior editor at the Production And Operations Management Journal (Behavioral Operations and Management of Technology departments) and associate editor for the Journal of Operations Management. His publications in POM, JOM, Management Science, Information Systems Research, MIS Quarterly and Journal of Applied Psychology, equal 28 published academic articles, with 32 additional articles appearing in other peer-reviewed outlets (Journal of Business Logistics, Decision Sciences, European Journal of Operational Research, and the International Journal of Operations and Production Management (Google scholar h-index of 40).

== Honors ==
Bendoly is the Operations Management Distinguished Scholar at the Academy of Management, and was formerly the Caldwell Research Fellow at Emory University. In 2020, an article reviewing 15 years of scholarship four top journals (Management Science, Journal of Operations Management, Production and Operations Management, M&SOM), Bendoly was listed as one of the most prolific operations management scholars to enter the field over that period (2000–2015).

== Publications ==
Bendoly is the author of seven books, including three editions of Excel Basics to Blackbelt (Cambridge Press 2020, 2013, 2008). He is the author of Excel Basics to BlackBelt, Strategic ERP Extension and Use, Handbook of Research in Enterprise Systems, Handbook of Behavioral Operations Management, and Visual Analytics for Management.

He is also the developer of the Blackbelt Ribbon add-in, several classroom mobile applications, and the prototype for enterprise student information systems (Navigator).

Bendoly is the originator of the OUtCoMES Cycle for problem structuring and examination, the ‘standard convention’ in visualization, among other frameworks and guides in analysis.

== Research ==
Bendoly's work on the fit between operating policies and IT system implementations / post-implementation use began with his work with SAP at Indiana University. Since then, he has worked on interdisciplinary studies with a range of OM and MIS researchers in an attempt to better bridge the knowledge bases of the two fields.

Much of this work deals with the fit between the use of enterprise systems/enterprise bolt-ons and the needs of the operations managers, new product developers, and overarching firm strategy.

His work has also had a focus on the sharing and use of specific forms of information across functions. The findings of his research at the firm level demonstrate the importance of issues such as fit with regards to operating policies and the use of technology. The findings also emphasize the importance of knowledge management, strategy/operations alignment, time-lagged effects and connections both among firms and among a given firm's functional units.

Bendoly co-edited the first special issue on Behavioral Operation in 2006. His interest with regards to the role of human behavior is divided into group-level/collaborative phenomena and individual-level responses to work policy, complexity and uncertainty. His work has investigated a range of dyadic collaborative and group settings primarily in the contexts of technology implementation/project management and supply chain management relationships. His work has investigated a range of worker and managerial task settings primarily in the contexts of technology implementation/project management and revenue management.

Survey and controlled laboratory experiments have been his primary methods applied. His findings have generally found that the interplay between operating and technical/informational conditions, as well as personal characteristics, influence the stress, arousal and general comfort of individuals. This ultimately drives effective motivation, the extent of work done, quality, and overall performance. The discounting of the nuanced interplay of these factors explains otherwise unanticipated losses in performance reported in the field.

== Recent publications ==
The following are three recent representative works of Professor Bendoly’s (authored/co-authored). Additional authors and additional details are available through the associated links, or via his Google Scholar page:

- How do you search for the best alternative? Experimental evidence on search strategies to solve complex problems. Management Science. Vol. 66, N°3, 2020.
- Systems dynamics understanding in project execution: information sharing quality and psychological safety. Production and Operations Management. Vol. 23, N°8, 2014.
- Real-time feedback and booking behavior in the hospitality industry: Moderating the balance between imperfect judgment and imperfect prescription. Journal of Operations Management. Vol. 31, N°1-2, 2013.
- Enterprise resource planning: developments and directions for operations management research.
