= Job enrichment =

Method of motivating employees

Job enrichment is a human resource management aimed at boosting employee motivation by redesigning jobs to include more complex, challenging tasks. These expanded responsibilities often require higher skill levels and may lead to increased compensation.

== Origin ==
Frederick Herzberg, an American psychologist, originally developed the concept of 'job enrichment' in 1968, in an article that he published on pioneering studies at AT&T. The concept stemmed from Herzberg's motivator-hygiene theory, which is based on the premise that job attitude is a construct of two independent factors, namely job satisfaction and job dissatisfaction. Job satisfaction encompasses intrinsic factors which arise from the work itself, including achievement and advancement, whilst job dissatisfaction stems from factors external to the actual work, including company policy and the quality of supervision.

He came up with this term while he was working on his "two factor theory" which states that both satisfaction (e.g. job satisfaction) and dissatisfaction are driven by separate factors that are completely independent of each other. To this effect he implies that just because an individual experiences a decrease in dissatisfaction, does not mean that the result is also an increase in satisfaction.

== Advantages and disadvantages ==
=== Advantages ===
- Learn new skills: By having more responsibilities, the employee will have the chance to work on new tasks and therefore learn new skills. Decision making can lead to the employee to think, decide, and try new things. By having to learn new skills, the employee has the opportunity to become proficient at certain tasks and even become experts.
- Reduce boredom: Job enrichment focuses on giving employees more variety and responsibilities. The target of job enrichment is to reduce the chance of boredom from the repetitive, tedious activities.
- Creates a better work environment: The net result of job enrichment is an overall more positive environment that promotes maximum productivity. This is simply because employees who are treated better tend to have better attitudes around the work place and tend to spread that positivism around the office.
- Employees can be free and motivated during workplace.

=== Disadvantages ===
- Lack of preparation: Because employees are given more activities and responsibilities in job enrichment, they do not necessarily have the right skills or experience for the job. Because the employee is not prepared or trained enough to do the activity, then they may not be as efficient as someone who is already trained or skilled in that particular activity. As a result, they may have a lower productivity rate.
- Heavier workload: Job enrichment increases the employee's overall workload. This requires skill in reprioritization for the employee. Some employees may not be able to quickly adjust to their new responsibilities. Employees may feel overloaded and tired, so they may have a lower productivity rate.
- Clash with non-participants: Understandably, not every employee at a company can participate in job enrichment. Those who cannot join may feel disconnected from the company and not part of the team. The employees who cannot join may even feel jealous towards participants.
- Poor performance: As a result of lack of preparation and heavier workload, some employees may not perform as efficient as prior to job enrichment. These employees may actually work better in a non job-enriching environment. By not doing as well as desired, they may feel inept. Their poor performance may lead to demotions, which tends to have a negative impact on the employee's self –confidence and motivation.

== Techniques ==
Job enrichment, as a managerial activity, includes a three-step technique:

1. Turn employees' effort into performance:
  - Ensuring that objectives are well-defined and understood by everyone. The overall corporate mission statement should be communicated to all. Individuals' goals should also be clear: each employee should know exactly how he/she fits into the overall process and be aware of how important their contribution is to the organization and its customers.
  - Providing adequate resources for each employee to perform well. This includes support functions like information technology, communication technology, and personnel training and development.
  - Creating a supportive corporate culture. This includes peer support networks, supportive management, and removing elements that foster mistrust and politicking.
  - Free flow of information. Eliminate secrecy.
  - Provide enough freedom to facilitate job excellence. Encourage and reward employee initiative. Flextime or compressed hours could be offered.
  - Provide adequate recognition, appreciation, and other motivators.
  - Provide skill improvement opportunities. This could include paid education at universities or on the job training.
  - Provide job variety. This can be done by job sharing or job rotation programmes.
  - It may be necessary to re-engineer the job process. This could involve redesigning the physical facility, redesign processes, change technologies, simplification of procedures, elimination of repetitiveness, redesigning authority structures.
2. Link employees performance directly to reward:
  - Clear definition of the reward is a must
  - Explanation of the link between performance and reward is important
  - Make sure the employee gets the right reward if performs well
  - If reward is not given, explanation is needed
3. Make sure the employee wants the reward. How to find out?
  - Ask them
  - Use surveys (checklist, listing, questions). Once you know what the employees want, give them the tools they need to earn it and follow through on your word.

== Versus job enlargement ==
Job enrichment can be contrasted to job enlargement which simply increases the number of tasks without changing the challenge. Job enrichment is seen as a vertical job restructuring technique where the focus is on giving the employee more authority, independence, and control over the manner the activity is completed. On the other hand, job enlargement is seen as a horizontal restructuring technique where the focus is merely increasing the number of assignments but does not change the overall authority, autonomy, and control of the projects. Job enlargements impact on the work environment is not always the most positive due to the fact that it is largely just an increase in work for the employee and not really a step up in responsibility. Job enrichment on the other hand is a very motivational technique in the management world. The act of enriching an employee's job not only is a sign of respect but it also shows that the employer actually cares about the employee as a person. This creates a desire for the employee to want to pay the employer back in the form of hard work, loyalty, and dedication the company.

== See also ==
- Sociotechnical systems
- Two factor theory

== Literature ==
- Brookins, M. (n.d.). The Advantages & Disadvantages of Job Enrichment. Retrieved from http://smallbusiness.chron.com/advantages-disadvantages-job-enrichment-11960.html
- Feder, B.J. 2000, "F.I. Herzberg, 76, Professor And Management Consultant", New York Times, Feb 1, 2000, pg. C26. Available from: ProQuest Historical Newspapers The New York Times (1851–2003). [28 October 2006].
- Hackman, J.R. & Oldham, G.R. 1976, 'Motivation through the design of work: Test of a Theory”, Organizational Behavior and Human Performance, [Online], vol. 16, no. 2, pp. 250–279. Available from: Science Direct. [1 November 2006].
- Mione, P. 2006, " Job Enrichment", Online paper. Effects : boredom, lack of flexibility, employee dissatisfaction
- Wall TD, Wood SJ, Leach DJ. (2004). Empowerment and performance. In Cooper CL, Robertson IT (Eds.), International review of industrial and organizational psychol-ogy, Volume 19. London: Wiley.
- What is job enrichment? (n.d.). Retrieved from http://www.businessdictionary.com/definition/job-enrichment.html
