= Two-factor theory =

Psychological theory of motivation

The two-factor theory (also known as motivation–hygiene theory, motivator–hygiene theory, and dual-factor theory) states that there are certain factors in the workplace that cause job satisfaction while a separate set of factors cause dissatisfaction, all of which act independently of each other. It was developed by psychologist Frederick Herzberg.

== Fundamentals ==
Feelings, attitudes and their connection with industrial mental health are related to Abraham Maslow's theory of motivation. His findings have had a considerable theoretical, as well as a practical, influence on attitudes toward administration. According to Herzberg, individuals are not content with the satisfaction of lower-order needs at work; for example, those needs associated with minimum salary levels or safe and pleasant working conditions. Rather, individuals look for the gratification of higher-level psychological needs having to do with achievement, recognition, responsibility, advancement, and the nature of the work itself. This appears to parallel Maslow's theory of a need hierarchy. However, Herzberg added a new dimension to this theory by proposing a two-factor model of motivation, based on the notion that the presence of one set of job characteristics or incentives leads to worker satisfaction at work, while another and separate set of job characteristics leads to dissatisfaction at work. Thus, satisfaction and dissatisfaction are not on a continuum with one increasing as the other diminishes, but are independent phenomena. This theory suggests that to improve job attitudes and productivity, administrators must recognize and attend to both sets of characteristics and not assume that an increase in satisfaction leads to decrease in dissatisfaction.

The two-factor theory developed from data collected by Herzberg from interviews with 203 engineers and accountants in the Pittsburgh area, chosen because of their professions' growing importance in the business world. Regarding the collection process:

Briefly, we asked our respondents to describe periods in their lives when they were exceedingly happy and unhappy with their jobs. Each respondent gave as many "sequences of events" as he could that met certain criteria— including a marked change in feeling, a beginning, and an end, and contained some substantive description other than feelings and interpretations... The proposed hypothesis appears verified. The factors on the right that led to satisfaction (achievement, intrinsic interest in the work, responsibility, and advancement) are mostly unipolar; that is, they contribute very little to job dissatisfaction. Conversely, the dis-satisfiers (company policy and administrative practices, supervision, interpersonal relationships, working conditions, and salary) contribute very little to job satisfaction.

— Herzberg, 1964

From analyzing these interviews, he found that job characteristics related to what an individual does — that is, to the nature of the work one performs — apparently have the capacity to gratify such needs as achievement, competency, status, personal worth, and self-realization, thus making him happy and satisfied. However, the absence of such gratifying job characteristics does not appear to lead to unhappiness and dissatisfaction. Instead, dissatisfaction results from unfavorable assessments of such job-related factors as company policies, supervision, technical problems, salary, interpersonal relations on the job, and working conditions. Thus, if management wishes to increase satisfaction on the job, it should be concerned with the nature of the work itself — the opportunities it presents for gaining status, assuming responsibility, and for achieving self-realization. If, on the other hand, management wishes to reduce dissatisfaction, then it must focus on the workplace environment — policies, procedures, supervision, and working conditions. If management is equally concerned with both, then managers must give attention to both sets of job factors.

Two-factor theory distinguishes between:

- Motivators (e.g. challenging work, recognition for one's achievement, responsibility, opportunity to do something meaningful, involvement in decision making, sense of importance to an organization) that give positive satisfaction, arising from intrinsic conditions of the job itself, such as recognition, achievement, or personal growth.
- Hygiene factors (e.g. status, job security, salary, fringe benefits, work conditions, good pay, paid insurance, vacations) that do not give positive satisfaction or lead to higher motivation, though dissatisfaction results from their absence. The term "hygiene" is used in the sense that these are maintenance factors. These are extrinsic to the work itself, and include aspects such as company policies, supervisory practices, or wages/salary. Herzberg often referred to hygiene factors as "KITA" factors, which is an acronym for "kick in the ass", the process of providing incentives or threat of punishment to make someone do something.

According to Herzberg, the absence of hygiene factors causes dissatisfaction among employees in the workplace. However, their presence does not ensure satisfaction entirely. There are several ways that this can be done but some of the most important ways to decrease dissatisfaction would be to pay reasonable wages, ensure employees job security, and to create a positive culture in the workplace. Herzberg considered the following hygiene factors from highest to lowest importance: company policy, supervision, employee's relationship with their boss, work conditions, salary, and relationships with peers. Eliminating dissatisfaction is only one half of the task of the two factor theory. The other half would be to increase satisfaction in the workplace. This can be done by improving on motivating factors. Motivation factors are needed to motivate an employee to higher performance. Herzberg also further classified our actions and how and why we do them, for example, if you perform a work related action because you have to then that is classed as "movement", but if you perform a work related action because you want to then that is classed as "motivation". Herzberg thought it was important to eliminate job dissatisfaction before going onto creating conditions for job satisfaction because it would work against each other. Satisfaction of the employees can have multiple positive effects for the organization. For example, when the employees share their knowledge, they satisfy their social needs and gain cohesion within the group. Also, sharing knowledge helps others to create new knowledge, which also can reinforce the motivating factors. By sharing knowledge, the employees feel satisfied and with the new knowledge it can increase the organizations innovation activities.

According to the two-factor theory, there are four possible combinations:

1. High hygiene + high motivation: The ideal situation where employees are highly motivated and have few complaints.
2. High hygiene + low motivation: Employees have few complaints but are not highly motivated. The job is viewed as a paycheck.
3. Low hygiene + high motivation: Employees are motivated but have a lot of complaints. A situation where the job is exciting and challenging but salaries and work conditions are not up to par.
4. Low hygiene + low motivation: This is the worst situation where employees are not motivated and have multiple complaints.

Unlike Maslow, who offered little data to support his ideas, Herzberg and others have presented considerable empirical evidence to confirm the motivation–hygiene theory, although their work has been criticized on methodological grounds.

== Workarounds ==
Herzberg's theory concentrates on the importance of internal job factors as motivating forces for employees. He designed it to increase job enrichment for employees. Herzberg wanted to create the opportunity for employees to take part in planning, performing, and evaluating their work. He suggested to do this by:

- Removing some of the control management has over employees and increasing the accountability and responsibility they have over their work, which would in return increase employee autonomy.
- Creating complete and natural work units where it is possible. An example would be allowing employees to create a whole unit or section instead of only allowing them to create part of it.
- Providing regular and continuous feedback on productivity and job performance directly to employees instead of through supervisors.
- Encouraging employees to take on new and challenging tasks and becoming experts at a task.

== Validity and criticisms ==
In 1968 Herzberg stated that his two-factor theory study had already been replicated 16 times in a wide variety of populations, including some in Communist countries, and corroborated with studies using different procedures that agreed with his original findings regarding intrinsic employee motivation, making it one of the most widely replicated studies on job attitudes.

One such replication was done by George Hines and published in December 1973 in the Journal of Applied Psychology. Hines tested Herzberg's two-factor motivation theory in New Zealand, using ratings of 12 job factors and overall job satisfaction obtained from 218 middle managers and 196 salaried employees. Contrary to dichotomous motivator–hygiene predictions, supervision and interpersonal relationships were ranked highly by those with high job satisfaction, and there was strong agreement between satisfied managers and salaried employees in the relative importance of job factors. Findings are interpreted in terms of social and employment conditions in New Zealand.

While the motivator–hygiene concept is still well regarded, satisfaction and dissatisfaction are generally no longer considered to exist on separate scales. The separation of satisfaction and dissatisfaction has been shown to be an artifact of the critical incident technique (CIT) used by Herzberg to record events. Furthermore, it has been noted the theory does not allow for individual differences, such as particular personality traits, which would affect individuals' unique responses to motivating or hygiene factors.

A number of behavioral scientists have pointed to inadequacies in the need for hierarchy and motivation–hygiene theories. The most basic is the criticism that both of these theories contain the relatively explicit assumption that happy and satisfied workers produce more, even though this might not be the case. For example, if playing a better game of golf is the means chosen to satisfy one's need for recognition, then one will find ways to play and think about golf more often, perhaps resulting in a lower output on the job due to a lower amount of focus.

Another problem however is that these and other statistical theories are concerned with explaining "average" behavior, despite considerable differences between individuals that may impact one's motivational factors. For instance, in their pursuit of status a person might take a balanced view and strive to pursue several behavioral paths in an effort to achieve a combination of personal status objectives.

In other words, an individual's expectation or estimated probability that a given behavior will bring a valued outcome determines their choice of means and the effort they will devote to these means. In effect, this diagram of expectancy depicts an employee asking themselves the question posed by one investigator, "How much payoff is there for me toward attaining a personal goal while expending so much effort toward the achievement of an assigned organizational objective?" The expectancy theory by Victor Vroom also provides a framework for motivation based on expectations.

This approach to the study and understanding of motivation would appear to have certain conceptual advantages over other theories: First, unlike Maslow's and Herzberg's theories, it is capable of handling individual differences. Second, its focus is toward the present and the future, in contrast to drive theory, which emphasizes past learning. Third, it specifically correlates behavior to a goal and thus eliminates the problem of assumed relationships, such as between motivation and performance. Fourth, it relates motivation to ability:

Performance = Motivation * Ability.

A study by the Gallup Organization, as detailed in the book First, Break All the Rules: What the World's Greatest Managers Do by Marcus Buckingham and Curt Coffman, appears to provide strong support for Herzberg's division of satisfaction and dissatisfaction onto two separate scales. In this book, the authors discuss how the study identified twelve questions that provide a framework for determining high-performing individuals and organizations. These twelve questions align squarely with Herzberg's motivation factors, while hygiene factors were determined to have little effect on motivating high performance.
