= Frederick Herzberg =

American psychologist

- Born: Frederick Irving Herzberg; April 18, 1923; Lynn, Massachusetts, U.S.
- Died: January 19, 2000 (aged 76); Salt Lake City, Utah, U.S.
- Education: City College of New York; University of Pittsburgh
- Spouse: Shirley Bedell (m. 1944)

Frederick Irving Herzberg (April 18, 1923 – January 19, 2000) was an American psychologist who became one of the most influential names in business management. He is most famous for introducing job enrichment and the motivator–hygiene theory. His 1968 publication "One More Time, How Do You Motivate Employees?" had sold 1.2 million reprints by 1987 and was the most requested article from the Harvard Business Review.

== Personal life ==
Herzberg was born in 1923 in Lynn, Massachusetts, to Gertrude and Lewis Herzberg, who were Lithuanian Jewish immigrants. He was brought up in New York City, and enrolled at the City College of New York in 1939. He did not finish his studies as he enlisted in the army. In 1944 he married Shirley Bedell, who later became a pediatrician.

During his military service Herzberg was involved in the relocation of internees from the Dachau Concentration Camp after its liberation. His experience with this work, where he "realized that a society goes insane when the sane are driven insane", has been seen as central to the development of his working philosophy.

He finally finished his studies and graduated from the City College of New York in 1946. He then decided to move to the University of Pittsburgh where he earned a master's degree in science and public health. He completed a Ph.D. at Pittsburgh focused on electric shock therapy. He has a son, Mark, who currently (as of 2013) lives in West New York.

== Research ==
Herzberg started his research on organizations in the 1950s. He worked at the University of Utah, where he remained until he retired. Prior to his move to Utah in 1972, Herzberg was professor of management at Case Western Reserve University, where he established the Department of Industrial Mental Health.

His research into the motivation to work was jointly published with Bernard Mausner and Barbara B. Snyderman, and his own Work and the Nature of Man was published in 1966.

In his lifetime, Herzberg had consulted for many organizations as well as for the United States and other foreign governments.

Herzberg's papers, covering his work from the 1950s to the 1990s, are held in the special collections archive at the University of Utah. The bulk of the material in the collection dates from the 1970s and 1980s.

== Motivator–hygiene theory ==
of motivation. According to his motivator–hygiene theory, also known as the two-factor theory of job satisfaction, people are influenced by two sets of factors: hygiene or maintenance factors, and motivators. The idea behind this distinction is that hygiene factors will not motivate, but if they are not there, they can lower motivation. These factors could be anything from clean toilets and comfortable chairs, to a reasonable level of pay and job security. The theory deals with satisfaction and dissatisfaction in jobs which are not affected by the same set of needs, but instead occur independently of each other. Herzberg's theory challenged the assumption that "dissatisfaction was a result of an absence of factors giving rise to satisfaction".

Motivational factors will not necessarily lower motivation, but can be responsible for increasing motivation. These factors could involve job recognition, potential for promotion or even the work in itself.

Herzberg (1987) describes the growth factors (or motivators) as "achievement, recognition for achievement, the work itself, responsibility, and growth or advancement", which are intrinsic. Intrinsic factors include "orientations toward money, recognition, competition, and the dictates of other people, and the latter includes challenge, enjoyment, personal enrichment, interest, and self-determination". The hygiene factors (or dissatisfaction-avoidance), which are extrinsic to the job, are "company policy and administration, supervision, interpersonal relationships, working conditions, salary, status, and security". This extrinsic factor "refers to doing something because it leads to a distinct outcome, something external you expect to receive, and the latter refers to doing something because it is inherently interesting or enjoyable, an internal reward."

== See also ==
- Hawthorne effect, which sheds light on the difficulties of measuring motivation.
- Motivation
