= Job enlargement =

Increasing scope of a job

Job enlargement means increasing the scope of a job through extending the range of its job duties and responsibilities generally within the same level and periphery. Job enlargement involves combining various activities at the same level in the organization and adding them to the existing job. It is also called the horizontal expansion of job activities. This contradicts the principles of specialisation and the division of labour whereby work is divided into small units, each of which is performed repetitively by an individual worker and the responsibilities are always clear. Some motivational theories suggest that the boredom and alienation caused by the division of labour can actually cause efficiency to fall. Thus, job enlargement seeks to motivate workers through reversing the process of specialisation. A typical approach might be to replace assembly lines with modular work; instead of an employee repeating the same step on each product, they perform several tasks on a single item. In order for employees to be provided with Job Enlargement they will need to be retrained in new fields to understand how each field works.

The objective of job enlargement is to motivate an employee by increasing his efforts and exposure towards achieving the organizational objectives as set for the job. By doing this, an employee can accomplish a wider range of their objectives without working in a repetitious manner. Job enlargement requires the management of the organization to provide their support in providing appropriate training to the employees to make them able to adapt to the enlarged job scope.

Some advantages of job enlargement are a variety of skills, improves earning capacity, and wide range of activities.

- Variety of skills – Job enlargement helps the organization to improve and increase the skills of the employee due to organization as well as the individual benefit.
- Improves earning capacity – with all the new activities a person learns from job enlargement, they are able to try to get a better salary when they apply for a new job.
- Wide range of activities – Employees are able to learn more activities which can help a company save money by reducing the number of employees they have.

However results have shown that this process can see its effects diminish after a period of time, as even the enlarged job role become the mundane, this in turn can lead to similar levels of demotivation and job dissatisfaction at the expense of increased training levels and costs. The continual enlargement of a job over time is also known as 'job creep', which can lead to an unmanageable workload.

Hulin and Blood (1968) define job enlargement as the process of allowing individual workers to determine their own pace (within limits), to serve as their own inspectors by giving them responsibility for quality control, to repair their own mistakes, to be responsible for their own machine set-up and repair, and to attain choice of method. Frederick Herzberg referred to the addition of interrelated tasks as 'horizontal job loading'.

== See also ==
- Job enrichment
- Personnel management
- Human resource management
- Job satisfaction
