= International Journal of Operations & Production Management =

- Discipline: Operations management, supply chain management
- Language: English
- Edited by: Jens Roehrich, Hugo Lam, Martin C. Schleper

Publication details
- History: 1980–present
- Publisher: Emerald Group Publishing
- Frequency: Monthly
- Impact factor: 9.9 (2022)

Standard abbreviations
- ISO 4: Int. J. Oper. Prod. Manag.

Indexing
- ISSN: 0144-3577
- LCCN: 00253510
- OCLC no.: 818873437

Links
- Journal homepage; Online archive

The International Journal of Operations and Production Management is a monthly peer-reviewed academic journal covering all aspects of supply chain management and operations management. It was established in 1980 and is published by Emerald Group Publishing. The editors-in-chief are Jens Roehrich (University of Bath), Hugo Lam (University of Liverpool), and Martin C. Schleper (NEOMA Business School). It is the official journal of the European Operations Management Association.

== Abstracting and indexing ==
The journal is abstracted and indexed in Current Contents/Social and Behavioral Sciences, Inspec, ProQuest databases, Social Sciences Citation Index, and Scopus.
