= Industrial and organizational psychology =

Branch of psychology

Industrial and organizational psychology (I-O psychology) "focuses the lens of psychological science on a key aspect of human life, namely, their work lives. In general, the goals of I-O psychology are to better understand and optimize the effectiveness, health, and well-being of both individuals and organizations." It is an applied discipline within psychology and is an international profession. I-O psychology is also known as occupational psychology in the United Kingdom, organisational psychology in Australia, South Africa and New Zealand, and work and organizational (WO) psychology throughout Europe and Brazil. Industrial, work, and organizational (IWO) psychology is the broader, more global term for the science and profession.

I-O psychologists are trained in the scientist–practitioner model. As an applied psychology field, the discipline involves both research and practice and I-O psychologists apply psychological theories and principles to organizations and the individuals within them. They contribute to an organization's success by improving the job performance, wellbeing, motivation, job satisfaction and the health and safety of employees. Industrial psychologists also assist individuals in making career decisions by conducting career assessments and guiding them through selecting and transitioning into a new career. Additionally, they support former employees in moving to alternative roles by providing structured outplacement services.

An Industrial-Organisational (I-O) psychologist conducts new scientific research and applies evidence-based findings and principles to evaluate and optimise employee attitudes, behaviors, emotions, motivation, and stress. The field is concerned with how these psychological constructs can be improved through recruitment processes, training and development programs, 360-degree feedback, change management, and other management systems and other interventions. I-O psychology research and practice also includes the work–nonwork interface such as occupational burnout, unemployment, retirement, and work–family conflict and balance.

I-O psychology is one of the 17 recognized professional specialties by the American Psychological Association (APA). In the United States the profession is represented by Division 14 of the APA and is formally known as the Society for Industrial and Organizational Psychology (SIOP). Similar I-O psychology societies can be found in many countries. In 2009 the Alliance for Organizational Psychology was formed and is a federation of Work, Industrial, & Organizational Psychology societies and "network partners" from around the world.

== International ==
I-O psychology is an international science and profession and depending on the region of the world, it is referred to by different titles. In North America, Canada and South Africa the title "I-O" psychology is used; in the United Kingdom, the field is known as occupational psychology. Occupational psychology in the UK is one of nine "protected titles" within the "practitioner psychologist" professions. The profession is regulated by the Health and Care Professions Council. In the UK, graduate programs in psychology, including occupational psychology, are accredited by the British Psychological Society.

In Europe, someone with a specialist EuroPsy Certificate in Work and Organisational Psychology is a fully qualified psychologist and a specialist in the work psychology field. Industrial and organizational psychologists reaching the EuroPsy standard are recorded in the Register of European Psychologists. I-O psychology is one of the three main psychology specializations in Europe.

In Australia, the title "organisational psychologist" is protected by law and regulated by the Australian Health Practitioner Regulation Agency (AHPRA). Organizational psychology is one of nine areas of specialist endorsement for psychology practice in Australia.

In South Africa, industrial psychology is a registration category for the profession of psychologist as regulated by the Health Professions Council of South Africa (HPCSA).

In 2009 The Alliance for Organizational psychology was formed and is a federation of Work, Industrial, & Organizational Psychology societies and "network partners" from around the world. In 2021 The British Psychological Society (BPS) Division of Occupational Psychology (DOP) and the Australian Psychological Society's (APS) College of Organizational Psychology joined the Alliance. The Alliance currently has member organizations representing Industrial, Work and Organisational psychology and IWO psychologists from Australia, Britain, Brazil, Canada, Chile, Europe, Germany, Hong Kong, Japan, Netherlands, New Zealand, Singapore, South Africa and the United States.

== Historical overview ==
The historical development of I-O psychology was paralleled in the US, the UK, Australia, Germany, the Netherlands, and Eastern European countries such as Romania. The roots of I-O psychology trace back to almost the beginning of psychology as a science, when Wilhelm Wundt founded one of the first psychological laboratories in 1879 in Leipzig, Germany. In the mid–1880s, Wundt trained two psychologists, Hugo Münsterberg and James McKeen Cattell, who went on to have a major influence on the emergence of I-O psychology. World War I was an impetus for the development of the field simultaneously in the UK and US. Hugo Munsterberg, one of the founders of I-O psychology, wrote, "Our aim is to sketch the outlines of a new science which is intermediate between the modern laboratory psychology and the problems of economics: the psychological experiment is systematically to be placed at the service of commerce and industry" (p. 3).

Instead of viewing performance differences as human "errors," Cattell was one of the first to recognize the importance of differences among individuals as a way of better understanding work behavior. Walter Dill Scott, who was a contemporary of Cattell and was elected President of the American Psychological Association (APA) in 1919, was arguably the most prominent I-O psychologist of his time. Scott, along with Walter Van Dyke Bingham, worked at what was then Carnegie Institute of Technology (now Carnegie Mellon University), developing methods for selecting and training sales personnel.

The "industrial" side of I-O psychology originated in research on individual differences, assessment, and the prediction of work performance. Industrial psychology crystallized during World War I, in response to the need to rapidly assign new troops to duty. Scott and Bingham volunteered to help with the testing and placement of more than a million U.S. Army recruits. In 1917, together with other prominent psychologists, they adapted the well-known intelligence test the Stanford–Binet, which was designed for testing one individual at a time, to make it suitable for group testing. The new test was called the Army Alpha. After the War, increasing employment in the U.S. created opportunities for I-O psychology practitioners who called themselves "industrial psychologists"

The "organizational" side of the field was focused on employee behavior, feelings, and well-being. During World War I, with the U.K. government's interest in worker productivity in munitions factories, Charles Myers studied worker fatigue and well-being. Following the war, Elton Mayo found that rest periods improved morale and reduced turnover in a Philadelphia textile factory. He later joined the ongoing Hawthorne studies, where he became interested in how workers' emotions and informal relationships affected productivity. The results of these studies ushered in the human relations movement.

World War II brought renewed interest in ability testing. The U.S. military needed to accurately place recruits in new technologically advanced jobs. There was also concern with morale and fatigue in war-industry workers. In the 1960s Arthur Kornhauser examined the impact on productivity of hiring mentally unstable workers. Kornhauser also examined the link between industrial working conditions and worker mental health as well as the spillover into a worker's personal life of having an unsatisfying job. Zickar noted that most of Kornhauser's I-O contemporaries favored management and Kornhauser was largely alone in his interest in protecting workers. Vinchur and Koppes (2010) observed that I-O psychologists' interest in job stress is a relatively recent development (p. 22).

The industrial psychology division of the former American Association of Applied Psychology became a division within APA, becoming Division 14 of APA. It was initially called the Industrial and Business Psychology Division. In 1962, the name was changed to the Industrial Psychology Division. In 1973, it was renamed again, this time to the Division of Industrial and Organizational Psychology. In 1982, the unit become more independent of APA, and its name was changed again, this time to the Society for Industrial and Organizational Psychology.

The name change of the division from "industrial psychology" to "industrial and organizational psychology" reflected the shift in the work of industrial psychologists who had originally addressed work behavior from the individual perspective, examining performance and attitudes of individual workers. Their work became broader. Group behavior in the workplace became a worthy subject of study. The emphasis on the "organizational" underlined the fact that when an individual joins an organization (e.g., the organization that hired them), they will be exposed to a common goal and a common set of operating procedures. In the 1970s in the UK, references to occupational psychology became more common than references to I-O psychology.

According to Bryan and Vinchur, "while organizational psychology increased in popularity through [the 1960s and 1970s], research and practice in the traditional areas of industrial psychology continued, primarily driven by employment legislation and case law".^{p. 53} There was a focus on fairness and validity in selection efforts as well as in the job analyses that undergirded selection instruments. For example, I-O psychology showed increased interest in behaviorally anchored rating scales. What critics there were of I-O psychology accused the discipline of being responsive only to the concerns of management.

From the 1980s to 2010s, other developments in I-O psychology took place. Researchers increasingly adopted a multi-level approach, attempting to understand behavioral phenomena from both the level of the organization and the level of the individual worker. There was also an increased interest in the needs and expectations of employees as individuals. For example, an emphasis on organizational justice and the psychological contract took root, as well as the more traditional concerns of selection and training. Methodological innovations (e.g., meta-analyses, structural equation modeling) were adopted. With the passage of the American with Disabilities Act in 1990 and parallel legislation elsewhere in the world, I-O psychology saw an increased emphasis on "fairness in personnel decisions." Training research relied increasingly on advances in educational psychology and cognitive science.

== Research methods ==
I-O researchers employ both qualitative and quantitative methods, although quantitative methods are far more common. Basic Quantitative methods used in I-O psychology include correlation, multiple regression, and analysis of variance. More advanced statistical methods include logistic regression, structural equation modeling, and hierarchical linear modeling (HLM; also known as multilevel modeling). I-O researchers have also employed meta-analysis. I-O psychologists also employ psychometric methods including methods associated with classical test theory, generalizability theory, and item response theory (IRT).

I-O psychologists have also employed qualitative methods, which largely involve focus groups, interviews, and case studies. I-O psychologists conducting research on organizational culture have employed ethnographic techniques and participant observation. A qualitative technique associated with I-O psychology is Flanagan's critical incident technique. I-O psychologists have also coordinated the use of quantitative and qualitative methods in the same study,

== Topics ==
I-O psychologists deal with a wide range of topics concerning people in the workplace.

=== Job analysis ===
Job analysis encompasses a number of different methods including, but not limited to, interviews, questionnaires, task analysis, and observation. A job analysis primarily involves the systematic collection of information about a job. A task-oriented job analysis involves an assessment of the duties, tasks, and/or competencies a job requires. By contrast, a worker-oriented job analysis involves an examination of the knowledge, skills, abilities, and other characteristics (KSAOs) required to successfully perform the work. Information obtained from job analyses are used for many purposes, including the creation of job-relevant selection procedures, the development of criteria for performance appraisals, the conducting of performance appraisals, and the development and implementation of training programs.

=== Personnel recruitment and selection ===
I-O psychologists design (a) recruitment processes and (b) personnel selection systems. Personnel recruitment is the process of identifying qualified candidates in the workforce and getting them to apply for jobs within an organization. Personnel recruitment processes include developing job announcements, placing ads, defining key qualifications for applicants, and screening out unqualified applicants.

Personnel selection is the systematic process of hiring and promoting personnel. Personnel selection systems employing I-O psychology methods use quantitative data to determine the most qualified candidates. This can involve the use of psychological tests, Biographical Information Blanks, interviews, work samples, and assessment centers.

Personnel selection procedures are usually validated, i.e., shown to be job relevant to personnel selection, using one or more of the following types of validity: content validity, construct validity, and/or criterion-related validity. I-O psychologists must adhere to professional standards in personnel selection efforts. SIOP (e.g., Principles for validation and use of personnel selection procedures) and APA together with the National Council on Measurement in Education (e.g., Standards for educational and psychological testing are sources of those standards. The Equal Employment Opportunity Commission's Uniform guidelines are also influential in guiding personnel selection decisions.

A meta-analysis of selection methods found that general mental ability (g factor) was the best overall predictor of job performance and attainment in training.

=== Performance appraisal/management ===
Performance appraisal or performance evaluation is the process in which an individual's or a group's work behaviors and outcomes are assessed against managers' and others' expectations for the job. Performance appraisal is used for a variety of purposes including alignment with organizational objectives, the basis for employment decisions (promotion, raises and termination), feedback to employees, and training needs assessment. Performance management is the process of providing performance feedback relative to expectations and information relevant to helping a worker improve their performance (e.g., coaching, mentoring). Performance management may also include documenting and tracking performance information for organizational evaluation purposes.

=== Individual assessment and psychometrics ===
Individual assessment involves the measurement of individual differences. I-O psychologists perform individual assessments in order to evaluate differences among candidates for employment as well as differences among employees. The constructs measured pertain to job performance. With candidates for employment, individual assessment is often part of the personnel selection process. These assessments can include written tests, aptitude tests, physical tests, psycho-motor tests, personality tests, integrity and reliability tests, work samples, simulations, and assessment centres.

=== Occupational health, safety and well-being ===
A more recent focus of I-O field is the health, safety, and well-being of employees. Topics include occupational safety, occupational stress, and workplace bullying, aggression and violence.

==== Occupational stress ====
There are many features of work that can be stressful to employees. Research has identified a number of job stressors (environmental conditions at work) that contribute to strains (adverse behavioral, emotional, physical, and psychological reactions). Occupational stress can have implications for organizational performance because of the emotions job stress evokes. For example, a job stressor such as conflict with a supervisor can precipitate anger that in turn motivates counterproductive workplace behaviors. A number of prominent models of job stress have been developed to explain the job stress process, including the person-environment (P-E) fit model, which was developed by University of Michigan social psychologists, and the demand-control(-support) and effort-reward imbalance models, which were developed by sociologists.

Research has also examined occupational stress in specific occupations, including police, general practitioners, and dentists. Another concern has been the relation of occupational stress to family life. Other I-O researchers have examined gender differences in leadership style and job stress and strain in the context of male- and female-dominated industries, and unemployment-related distress. Occupational stress has also been linked to lack of fit between people and their jobs.

==== Occupational safety ====
Accidents and safety in the workplace are important because of the serious injuries and fatalities that are all too common. Research has linked accidents to psychosocial factors in the workplace including overwork that leads to fatigue, workplace violence, and working night shifts. "Stress audits" can help organizations remain compliant with various occupational safety regulations. Psychosocial hazards can affect musculoskeletal disorders. A psychosocial factor related to accident risk is safety climate, which refers to employees' perceptions of the extent to which their work organization prioritizes safety. By contrast, psychosocial safety climate refers to management's "policies, practices, and procedures" aimed at protecting workers' psychological health. Research on safety leadership is also relevant to understanding employee safety performance. Research suggests that safety-oriented transformational leadership is associated with a positive safety climate and safe worker practices.

==== Workplace bullying, aggression and violence ====
I-O psychologists are concerned with the related topics of workplace bullying, aggression, and violence. For example, I-O research found that exposure to workplace violence elicited ruminative thinking. Ruminative thinking is associated with poor well-being. Research has found that interpersonal aggressive behaviour is associated with worse team performance.

==== Relation to occupational health psychology ====
A new discipline, occupational health psychology (OHP), emerged from both health psychology and I-O psychology as well as occupational medicine. OHP concerns itself with such topic areas as the impact of occupational stressors on mental and physical health, the health impact of involuntary unemployment, violence and bullying in the workplace, psychosocial factors that influence accident risk and safety, work–family balance, and interventions designed to improve/protect worker health. Spector observed that one of the problems facing I-O psychologists in the late 20^{th} century who were interested in the health of working people was resistance within the field to publishing papers on worker health. In the 21^{st} century, OHP topics have become popular at the Society for Industrial and Organizational Psychology conference.

=== Work design ===
Work design concerns the "content and organisation of one's work tasks, activities, relationships, and responsibilities." Research has demonstrated that work design has important implications for individual employees (e.g., level of engagement, job strain, chance of injury), teams (e.g., how effectively teams co-ordinate their activities), organisations (e.g., productivity, safety, efficiency targets), and society (e.g., whether a nation utilises the skills of its population or promotes effective aging).

I-O psychologists review job tasks, relationships, and an individual's way of thinking about their work to ensure that their roles are meaningful and motivating, thus creating greater productivity and job satisfaction. Deliberate interventions aimed at altering work design are sometimes referred to as work redesign. Such interventions can be initiated by the management of an organization (e.g., job rotation, job enlargement, job enrichment) or by individual workers (e.g., job crafting, role innovation, idiosyncratic ideals).

=== Training and training evaluation ===
Training involves the systematic teaching of skills, concepts, or attitudes that results in improved performance in another environment. Because many people hired for a job are not already versed in all the tasks the job requires, training may be needed to help the individual perform the job effectively. Evidence indicates that training is often effective, and that it succeeds in terms of higher net sales and gross profitability per employee.

Similar to performance management (see above), an I-O psychologist would employ a job analysis in concert with the application of the principles of instructional design to create an effective training program. A training program is likely to include a summative evaluation at its conclusion in order to ensure that trainees have met the training objectives and can perform the target work tasks at an acceptable level. Kirkpatrick describes four levels of criteria by which to evaluate training:

- Reactions are the extent to which trainees enjoyed the training and found it worthwhile.
- Learning is the knowledge and skill trainees acquired from the training.
- Behavior is the change in behavior trainees exhibit on the job after training, for example, did they perform trained tasks more quickly?
- Results are the effect of the change in knowledge or behavior on the job, for example, was overall productivity increased or costs decreased?

Training programs often include formative evaluations to assess the effect of the training as the training proceeds. Formative evaluations can be used to locate problems in training procedures and help I-O psychologists make corrective adjustments while training is ongoing.

The foundation for training programs is learning. Learning outcomes can be organized into three broad categories: cognitive, skill-based, and affective outcomes. Cognitive training is aimed at instilling declarative knowledge or the knowledge of rules, facts, and principles (e.g., police officer training covers laws and court procedures). Skill-based training aims to impart procedural knowledge (e.g., skills needed to use a special tool) or technical skills (e.g., understanding the workings of software program). Affective training concerns teaching individuals to develop specific attitudes or beliefs that predispose trainees to behave a certain way (e.g., show commitment to the organization, appreciate diversity).

A needs assessment, an analysis of corporate and individual goals, is often undertaken prior to the development of a training program. In addition, a careful training needs analysis is required in order to develop a systematic understanding of where training is needed, what should be taught, and who will be trained. A training needs analysis typically involves a three-step process that includes organizational analysis, task analysis, and person analysis.

An organizational analysis is an examination of organizational goals and resources as well as the organizational environment. The results of an organizational analysis help to determine where training should be directed. The analysis identifies the training needs of different departments or subunits. It systematically assesses manager, peer, and technological support for transfer of training. An organizational analysis also takes into account the climate of the organization and its subunits. For example, if a climate for safety is emphasized throughout the organization or in subunits of the organization (e.g., production), then training needs will likely reflect an emphasis on safety. A task analysis uses the results of a job analysis to determine what is needed for successful job performance, contributing to training content. With organizations increasingly trying to identify "core competencies" that are required for all jobs, task analysis can also include an assessment of competencies. A person analysis identifies which individuals within an organization should receive training and what kind of instruction they need. Employee needs can be assessed using a variety of methods that identify weaknesses that training can address.

=== Motivation in the workplace ===
Work motivation reflects the energy an individual applies "to initiate work-related behavior, and to determine its form, direction, intensity, and duration" Understanding what motivates an organization's employees is central to I-O psychology. Motivation is generally thought of as a theoretical construct that fuels behavior. An incentive is an anticipated reward that is thought to incline a person to behave a certain way. Motivation varies among individuals. Studying its influence on behavior, it must be examined together with ability and environmental influences. Because of motivation's role in influencing workplace behavior and performance, many organizations structure the work environment to encourage productive behaviors and discourage unproductive behaviors.

Motivation involves three psychological processes: arousal, direction, and intensity. Arousal is what initiates action. It is often fueled by a person's need or desire for something that is missing from their life, either totally or partially. Direction refers to the path employees take in accomplishing the goals they set for themselves. Intensity is the amount of energy employees put into goal-directed work performance. The level of intensity often reflects the importance and difficulty of the goal. These psychological processes involve four factors. First, motivation serves to direct attention, focusing on particular issues, people, tasks, etc. Second, it serves to stimulate effort. Third, motivation influences persistence. Finally, motivation influences the choice and application of task-related strategies.

=== Organizational climate ===
Organizational climate is the perceptions of employees about what is important in an organization, that is, what behaviors are encouraged versus discouraged. It can be assessed in individual employees (climate perceptions) or averaged across groups of employees within a department or organization (organizational climate). Climates are usually focused on specific employee outcomes, or what is called “climate for something”. There are more than a dozen types of climates that have been assessed and studied. Some of the more popular include:

- Customer service climate: The emphasis placed on providing good service. It has been shown to relate to employee service performance.
- Diversity climate: The extent to which organizations value differences among employees and expect employees to treat everyone with respect. It has been linked to job satisfaction.
- Ethical climate: The extent to which organizations emphasize ethical practices.
- Innovation climate: The extent to which organizations encourage employees to use new approaches.
- Psychosocial safety climate: Organizations with such climates emphasize the importance of psychological health and well-being.
- Safety climate: Such organizations emphasize safety and have fewer accidents and injuries.

Climate concerns organizational policies and practices that encourage or discourage specific behaviors by employees. Shared perceptions of what the organization emphasizes (organizational climate) is part of organizational culture.

=== Organizational culture ===
While there is no universal definition for organizational culture, a collective understanding shares the following assumptions:

... that they are related to history and tradition, have some depth, are difficult to grasp and account for, and must be interpreted; that they are collective and shared by members of groups and primarily ideational in character, having to do with values, understandings, beliefs, knowledge, and other intangibles; and that they are holistic and subjective rather than strictly rational and analytical.

Organizational culture has been shown to affect important organizational outcomes such as performance, attraction, recruitment, retention, employee satisfaction, and employee well-being. There are three levels of organizational culture: artifacts, shared values, and basic beliefs and assumptions. Artifacts comprise the physical components of the organization that relay cultural meaning. Shared values are individuals' preferences regarding certain aspects of the organization's culture (e.g., loyalty, customer service). Basic beliefs and assumptions include individuals' impressions about the trustworthiness and supportiveness of an organization, and are often deeply ingrained within the organization's culture.

In addition to an overall culture, organizations also have subcultures. Subcultures can be departmental (e.g. different work units) or defined by geographical distinction. While there is no single "type" of organizational culture, some researchers have developed models to describe different organizational cultures.

=== Group behavior ===
Group behavior involves the interactions among individuals in a collective. Most I-O group research is about teams, which are groups in which people work together to achieve the same task goals. The individuals' opinions, attitudes, and adaptations affect group behavior, with group behavior in turn affecting those opinions, etc. The interactions are thought to fulfill some need satisfaction in an individual who is part of the collective.

==== Team effectiveness ====
Organizations often organize teams because teams can accomplish a much greater amount of work in a short period of time than an individual can accomplish. I-O research has examined the harm workplace aggression does to team performance.

==== Team composition ====
Team composition, or the configuration of team member knowledge, skills, abilities, and other characteristics, fundamentally influences teamwork. Team composition can be considered in the selection and management of teams to increase the likelihood of team success. To achieve high-quality results, teams built with members having higher skill levels are more likely to be effective than teams built around members having lesser skills; teams that include members with a diversity of skills are also likely to show improved team performance. Team members should also be compatible in terms of personality traits, values, and work styles. There is substantial evidence that personality traits and values can shape the nature of teamwork, and influence team performance.

==== Team task design ====
A fundamental question in team task design is whether or not a task is even appropriate for a team. Those tasks that require predominantly independent work are best left to individuals, and team tasks should include those tasks that consist primarily of interdependent work. When a given task is appropriate for a team, task design can play a key role in team effectiveness.

Job characteristic theory identifies core job dimensions that affect motivation, satisfaction, performance, etc. These dimensions include skill variety, task identity, task significance, autonomy and feedback. The dimensions map well to the team environment. Individual contributors who perform team tasks that are challenging, interesting, and engaging are more likely to be motivated to exert greater effort and perform better than team members who are working on tasks that lack those characteristics.

==== Organizational resources ====
Organizational support systems affect the team effectiveness and provide resources for teams operating in the multi-team environment. During the chartering of new teams, organizational enabling resources are first identified. Examples of enabling resources include facilities, equipment, information, training, and leadership. Team-specific resources (e.g., budgetary resources, human resources) are typically made available. Team-specific human resources represent the individual contributors who are selected to be team members. Intra-team processes (e.g., task design, task assignment) involve these team-specific resources. Teams also function in dynamic multi-team environments. Teams often must respond to shifting organizational contingencies.

==== Team rewards ====
Organizational reward systems drive the strengthening and enhancing of individual team member efforts; such efforts contribute towards reaching team goals. In other words, rewards that are given to individual team members should be contingent upon the performance of the entire team.

Several design elements are needed to enable organizational reward systems to operate successfully. First, for a collective assessment to be appropriate for individual team members, the group's tasks must be highly interdependent. If this is not the case, individual assessment is more appropriate than team assessment. Second, individual-level reward systems and team-level reward systems must be compatible. For example, it would be unfair to reward the entire team for a job well done if only one team member did most of the work. That team member would most likely view teams and teamwork negatively, and would not want to work on a team in the future. Third, an organizational culture must be created such that it supports and rewards employees who believe in the value of teamwork and who maintain a positive attitude towards team-based rewards.

==== Team goals ====
Goals potentially motivate team members when goals contain three elements: difficulty, acceptance, and specificity. Under difficult goal conditions, teams with more committed members tend to outperform teams with less committed members. When team members commit to team goals, team effectiveness is a function of how supportive members are with each other. The goals of individual team members and team goals interact. Team and individual goals must be coordinated. Individual goals must be consistent with team goals in order for a team to be effective.

=== Job satisfaction and commitment ===
Job satisfaction is often thought to reflect the extent to which a worker likes their job, or individual aspects or facets of jobs. It is one of the most heavily researched topics in I-O psychology. Job satisfaction has theoretical and practical utility for the field. It has been linked to important job outcomes including absenteeism, accidents, counterproductive work behavior, customer service, cyberloafing, job performance, organizational citizenship behavior, physical and psychological health, and turnover. A meta-analyses found job satisfaction to be related to life satisfaction, happiness, positive affect, and the absence of negative affect.

=== Productive behavior ===
Productive behavior is defined as employee behavior that contributes positively to the goals and objectives of an organization. When an employee begins a new job, there is a transition period during which they may not contribute significantly. To assist with this transition an employee typically requires job-related training. In financial terms, productive behavior represents the point at which an organization begins to achieve some return on the investment it has made in a new employee. I-O psychologists are ordinarily more focused on productive behavior than job or task performance, including in-role and extra-role performance. In-role performance tells managers how well an employee performs the required aspects of the job; extra-role performance includes behaviors that are not necessarily required by job but nonetheless contribute to organizational effectiveness. By taking both in-role and extra-role performance into account, an I-O psychologist is able to assess employees' effectiveness (how well they do what they were hired to do), efficiency (outputs to relative inputs), and productivity (how much they help the organization reach its goals). Three forms of productive behavior that I-O psychologists often evaluate include job performance, organizational citizenship behavior (see below), and innovation.

==== Job performance ====
Job performance represents behaviors employees engage in while at work which contribute to organizational goals. These behaviors are formally evaluated by an organization as part of an employee's responsibilities. In order to understand and ultimately predict job performance, it is important to be precise when defining the term. Job performance is about behaviors that are within the control of the employee and not about results (effectiveness), the costs involved in achieving results (productivity), the results that can be achieved in a period of time (efficiency), or the value an organization places on a given level of performance, effectiveness, productivity or efficiency (utility).

To model job performance, researchers have attempted to define a set of dimensions that are common to all jobs. Using a common set of dimensions provides a consistent basis for assessing performance and enables the comparison of performance across jobs. Performance is commonly broken into two major categories: in-role (technical aspects of a job) and extra-role (non-technical abilities such as communication skills and being a good team member). While this distinction in behavior has been challenged it is commonly made by both employees and management. A model of performance by Campbell breaks performance into in-role and extra-role categories. Campbell labeled job-specific task proficiency and non-job-specific task proficiency as in-role dimensions, while written and oral communication, demonstrating effort, maintaining personal discipline, facilitating peer and team performance, supervision and leadership and management and administration are labeled as extra-role dimensions. Murphy's model of job performance also broke job performance into in-role and extra-role categories. However, task-orientated behaviors composed the in-role category and the extra-role category included interpersonally-oriented behaviors, down-time behaviors and destructive and hazardous behaviors. However, it has been challenged as to whether the measurement of job performance is usually done through pencil/paper tests, job skills tests, on-site hands-on tests, off-site hands-on tests, high-fidelity simulations, symbolic simulations, task ratings and global ratings. These various tools are often used to evaluate performance on specific tasks and overall job performance. Van Dyne and LePine developed a measurement model in which overall job performance was evaluated using Campbell's in-role and extra-role categories. Here, in-role performance was reflected through how well "employees met their performance expectations and performed well at the tasks that made up the employees' job." Dimensions regarding how well the employee assists others with their work for the benefit of the group, if the employee voices new ideas for projects or changes to procedure and whether the employee attends functions that help the group composed the extra-role category.

To assess job performance, reliable and valid measures must be established. While there are many sources of error with performance ratings, error can be reduced through rater training and through the use of behaviorally-anchored rating scales. Such scales can be used to clearly define the behaviors that constitute poor, average, and superior performance. Additional factors that complicate the measurement of job performance include the instability of job performance over time due to forces such as changing performance criteria, the structure of the job itself and the restriction of variation in individual performance by organizational forces. These factors include errors in job measurement techniques, acceptance and the justification of poor performance, and lack of importance of individual performance.

The determinants of job performance consist of factors having to do with the individual worker as well as environmental factors in the workplace. According to Campbell's Model of The Determinants of Job Performance, job performance is a result of the interaction between declarative knowledge (knowledge of facts or things), procedural knowledge (knowledge of what needs to be done and how to do it), and motivation (reflective of an employee's choices regarding whether to expend effort, the level of effort to expend, and whether to persist with the level of effort chosen). The interplay between these factors show that an employee may, for example, have a low level of declarative knowledge, but may still have a high level of performance if the employee has high levels of procedural knowledge and motivation.

Regardless of the job, three determinants stand out as predictors of performance: (1) general mental ability (especially for jobs higher in complexity); (2) job experience (although there is a law of diminishing returns); and (3) the personality trait of conscientiousness (people who are dependable and achievement-oriented, who plan well). These determinants appear to influence performance largely through the acquisition and usage of job knowledge and the motivation to do well. Further, an expanding area of research in job performance determinants includes emotional intelligence.

==== Organizational citizenship behavior ====
Organizational citizenship behaviors (OCBs) are another form of workplace behavior that I-O psychologists are involved with. OCBs tend to be beneficial to both the organization and other workers. Dennis Organ (1988) defines OCBs as "individual behavior that is discretionary, not directly or explicitly recognized by the formal reward system, and that in the aggregate promotes the effective functioning of the organization." Behaviors that qualify as OCBs can fall into one of the following five categories: altruism, courtesy, sportsmanship, conscientiousness, and civic virtue. OCBs have also been categorized in other ways too, for example, by their intended targets individuals, supervisors, and the organization as a whole. Other alternative ways of categorizing OCBs include "compulsory OCBs", which are engaged in owing to coercive persuasion or peer pressure rather than out of good will. The extent to which OCBs are voluntary has been the subject of some debate.

Other research suggests that some employees perform OCBs to influence how they are viewed within the organization. While these behaviors are not formally part of the job description, performing them can influence performance appraisals. Researchers have advanced the view that employees engage in OCBs as a form of "impression management," a term coined by Erving Goffman. Goffman defined impression management as "the way in which the individual ... presents himself and his activity to others, the ways in which he guides and controls the impression they form of him, and the kinds of things he may and may not do while sustaining his performance before them. Some researchers have hypothesized that OCBs are not performed out of good will, positive affect, etc., but instead as a way of being noticed by others, including supervisors.

==== Innovation ====
Four qualities are generally linked to creative and innovative behaviour by individuals:

- Task-relevant skills (general mental ability and job specific knowledge). Task specific and subject specific knowledge is most often gained through higher education; however, it may also be gained by mentoring and experience in a given field.
- Creativity-relevant skills (ability to concentrate on a problem for long periods of time, to abandon unproductive searches, and to temporarily put aside stubborn problems). The ability to put aside stubborn problems is referred to by Jex and Britt as productive forgetting. Creativity-relevant skills also require the individual contributor to evaluate a problem from multiple vantage points. One must be able to take on the perspective of various users. For example, an Operation Manager analyzing a reporting issue and developing an innovative solution would consider the perspective of a sales person, assistant, finance, compensation, and compliance officer.
- Task motivation (internal desire to perform task and level of enjoyment).

At the organizational level, a study by Damanpour identified four specific characteristics that may predict innovation:

1. A population with high levels of technical knowledge
2. The organization's level of specialization
3. The level an organization communicates externally
4. Functional differentiation.

=== Counterproductive work behavior ===
Counterproductive work behavior (CWB) can be defined as employee behavior that goes against the goals of an organization. These behaviors can be intentional or unintentional and result from a wide range of underlying causes and motivations. Some CWBs have instrumental motivations (e.g., theft). It has been proposed that a person-by-environment interaction can be utilized to explain a variety of counterproductive behaviors. For instance, an employee who sabotages another employee's work may do so because of lax supervision (environment) and underlying psychopathology (person) that work in concert to result in the counterproductive behavior. There is evidence that an emotional response (e.g., anger) to job stress (e.g., unfair treatment) can motivate CWBs.

The forms of counterproductive behavior with the most empirical examination are ineffective job performance, absenteeism, job turnover, and accidents. Less common but potentially more detrimental forms of counterproductive behavior have also been investigated including violence and sexual harassment.

=== Leadership ===
Leadership can be defined as a process of influencing others to agree on a shared purpose, and to work towards shared objectives. A distinction should be made between leadership and management. Managers process administrative tasks and organize work environments. Although leaders may be required to undertake managerial duties as well, leaders typically focus on inspiring followers and creating a shared organizational culture and values. Managers deal with complexity, while leaders deal with initiating and adapting to change. Managers undertake the tasks of planning, budgeting, organizing, staffing, controlling, and problem solving. In contrast, leaders undertake the tasks of setting a direction or vision, aligning people to shared goals, communicating, and motivating.

Approaches to studying leadership can be broadly classified into three categories: Leader-focused approaches, contingency-focused approaches, and follower-focused approaches.

==== Leader-focused approaches ====
Leader-focused approaches look to organizational leaders to determine the characteristics of effective leadership. According to the trait approach, more effective leaders possess certain traits that less effective leaders lack. More recently, this approach is being used to predict leader emergence. The following traits have been identified as those that predict leader emergence when there is no formal leader: high intelligence, high needs for dominance, high self-motivation, and socially perceptive. Another leader-focused approached is the behavioral approach, which focuses on the behaviors that distinguish effective from ineffective leaders. There are two categories of leadership behaviors: consideration and initiating structure. Behaviors associated with the category of consideration include showing subordinates they are valued and that the leader cares about them. An example of a consideration behavior is showing compassion when problems arise in or out of the office. Behaviors associated with the category of initiating structure include facilitating the task performance of groups. One example of an initiating structure behavior is meeting one-on-one with subordinates to explain expectations and goals. The final leader-focused approach is power and influence. To be most effective, a leader should be able to influence others to behave in ways that are in line with the organization's mission and goals. How influential a leader can be depends on their social power – their potential to influence their subordinates. There are six bases of power: French and Raven's classic five bases of coercive, reward, legitimate, expert, and referent power, plus informational power. A leader can use several different tactics to influence others within an organization. These include: rational persuasion, inspirational appeal, consultation, ingratiation, exchange, personal appeal, coalition, legitimating, and pressure.

==== Contingency-focused approaches ====
Of the 3 approaches to leadership, contingency-focused approaches have been the most prevalent over the past 30 years. Contingency-focused theories base a leader's effectiveness on their ability to assess a situation and adapt their behavior accordingly. These theories assume that an effective leader can accurately "read" a situation and skillfully employ a leadership style that meets the needs of the individuals involved and the task at hand. A brief introduction to the most prominent contingency-focused theories will follow.

The Fiedler contingency model holds that a leader's effectiveness depends on the interaction between their characteristics and the characteristics of the situation. Path–goal theory asserts that the role of the leader is to help their subordinates achieve their goals. To effectively do this, leaders must skillfully select from four different leadership styles to meet the situational factors. The situational factors are a product of the characteristics of subordinates and the characteristics of the environment. The leader–member exchange theory (LMX) focuses on how leader–subordinate relationships develop. Generally speaking, when a subordinate performs well or when there are positive exchanges between a leader and a subordinate, their relationship is strengthened, performance and job satisfaction are enhanced, and the subordinate will feel more commitment to the leader and the organization as a whole. Vroom-Yetton-Jago model focuses on decision-making with respect to a feasibility set.

==== Organizational development ====
I-O psychologists may also become involved with organizational change, a process which some call organizational development (OD). Tools used to advance organization development include the survey-feedback technique. The technique involves the periodic assessment (via surveys) of employee attitudes and feelings. The results are conveyed to organizational stakeholders, who may want to take the organization in a particular direction. Another tool is the team-building technique. "Team building is probably the No. 1 human resources intervention in the world. Yet the results of such programs are mixed."

=== Work–nonwork interface ===
An important topic in I-O is the connection between people’s working and nonworking lives. Two concepts are particularly relevant. Work–family conflict is the incompatibility between the job and family life. Conflict can occur when stressful experiences in one domain spillover into the other, such as someone coming home in a bad mood after having a difficult day at work. It can also occur when there are time conflicts, such as having a work meeting at the same time as a child’s doctor’s appointment.

Work–family enrichment (also called work–family facilitation) occurs when one domain provides benefits to the other. For example, a spouse might assist with a work task or a supervisor might offer assistance with a family problem.

=== Relation to organizational behavior and human resource management ===
I-O psychology and organizational behavior researchers have sometimes investigated similar topics. The overlap has led to some confusion regarding how the two disciplines differ. Sometimes there has been confusion within organizations regarding the practical duties of I-O psychologists and human resource management specialists.

== As an occupation ==
=== Training ===
The minimum requirement for working as an I-O psychologist is a master's degree. Normally, this degree requires about two to three years of postgraduate work to complete. Of all the degrees granted in I-O psychology each year, approximately two-thirds are at the master's level.

A comprehensive list of US and Canadian master's and doctoral programs can be found at the web site of the Society for Industrial and Organizational Psychology (SIOP). Admission into I-O psychology PhD programs is highly competitive; many programs accept only a small number of applicants each year.

There are graduate degree programs in I-O psychology outside of the US and Canada. The SIOP web site lists some of them.

In Australia, organisational psychologists must be accredited by the Australian Psychological Society (APS). To become an organisational psychologist, one must meet the criteria for a general psychologist's licence: three years studying bachelor's degree in psychology, 4th-year honours degree or postgraduate diploma in psychology, and two-year full-time supervised practice plus 80 hours of professional development. There are other avenues available, such as a two-year supervised training program after honours (i.e. 4+2 pathway), or one year of postgraduate coursework and practical placements followed by a one-year supervised training program (i.e. 5+1 pathway). After this, psychologists can elect to specialise as Organisational Psychologists in Australia.

=== Competencies ===
There are many different sets of competencies for different specializations within I-O psychology and I-O psychologists are versatile behavioral scientists. For example, an I-O psychologist specializing in selection and recruiting should have expertise in finding the best talent for the organization and getting everyone on board while they might not need to know much about executive coaching. Some I-O psychologists specialize in specific areas of consulting whereas others tend to generalize their areas of expertise. There are basic skills and knowledge an individual needs in order to be an effective I-O psychologist, which include being an independent learner, interpersonal skills (e.g., listening skills), and general consultation skills (e.g., skills and knowledge in the problem area).

=== Job outlook ===
U.S. News & World Report lists I-O Psychology as the third best science job, with a strong job market in the U.S. In the 2020 SIOP salary survey, the median annual salary for a PhD in I-O psychology was $125,000; for a master's level I-O psychologist was $88,900. The highest paid PhD I-O psychologists were self-employed consultants who had a median annual income of $167,000. The highest paid in private industry worked in IT ($153,000), retail ($151,000) and healthcare ($147,000). The lowest earners were found in state and local government positions, averaging approximately $100,000, and in academic positions in colleges and universities that do not award doctoral degrees, with median salaries between $80,000 and $94,000.

== Ethical principles ==
An I-O psychologist, whether an academic, consultant or an employee of an organization, is expected to maintain high ethical standards. SIOP encourages its members to follow the APA Ethics Code. With more organizations becoming global, it is important that when an I-O psychologist works outside their home country, the psychologist is aware of rules, regulations, and cultures of the organizations and countries in which the psychologist works, while also adhering to the ethical standards set at home.

== See also ==
- Applied psychology
- Behavioral risk management
- Educational psychology
- Employment law
- European Academy of Occupational Health Psychology
- Fail fast (business)
- Human resources development
- Human resource management
- Individual psychological assessment
- Industrial Revolution
- Industrial sociology
- Kick the cat
- Kiss up kick down
- Machiavellianism in the workplace
- Mechanization
- Narcissism in the workplace
- Occupational stress
- Occupational safety and health
- Occupational health psychology
- Organizational behavior
- Organizational learning
- Organizational socialization
- Outline of psychology
- Personnel psychology
- Psychopathy in the workplace
- Quality of working life
- Society for Occupational Health Psychology
- Systems psychology
