= Compa-ratio =

Used to assess the competitiveness of an employee's pay level

The formula commonly used by compensation professionals to assess the competitiveness of an employee's pay level involves calculating a compa-ratio. Compa-ratio is the short form for comparative ratio.

== Calculation ==
Compa-ratio is calculated as the employee's current salary divided by the current market rate as defined by the company's competitive pay policy. Compa-ratios are position-specific. Each position has a salary range that includes a minimum, a midpoint, and a maximum. These three values represent industry averages for the position. A compa-ratio of 1.00 or 100% means that the employee is paid exactly what the industry average pays and is at the midpoint for the salary range. A ratio of 0.75 means that the employee is paid 25% below the industry average and is at risk of seeking employment with competitors at a higher pay that is perceived as equitable. A ratio of 1.15 compa-ratio would mean the employee is paid above the industry average.

== Types of compa-ratios ==
=== Individual compa-ratio ===
The individual compa-ratio, which describes the individual's position in the pay range against the pay policy reference point for the range and can be used to reposition an individual's pay in the range if it is too high or low.

=== Group compa-ratio ===
The group compa-ratio, which quantifies the relationship between practice and policy for the whole organization or a defined population group (function, department, occupation or job family). It is a calculation of the sum of actual pay as a percentage of the sum of job reference point rates. This ratio has an important part to play in the overall pay management process. It can be used to establish how pay policy has been implemented overall and identify differences between parts of the organization which may indicate problems in the policy itself or in the way it has been implemented by managers. It can also be used to plan and control pay budgets.

=== Average compa-ratio ===
The average compa-ratio is the sum of each individual's compa-ratio divided by the number of individuals. It is, therefore, not the same as a group compa-ratio, which is based on the relationship between the sums of actual rates of pay and the sums of job reference points of pay. The average compa-ratio can, therefore, differ from the group compa-ratio according to the spread of individual compa-ratios at different job sizes. The group ratio is more frequently used.

== Interpretation of compa-ratios ==
Compa-ratios establish differences between policy and practice. The reasons for such differences need to be established. They may be attributable to one or more of the following factors:

- differences in aggregate performance levels or performance ratings;
- differences in average job tenure - average tenure may be short when people leave the job through promotion, transfer or resignation before they have moved far through the range and this would result in a lower compa-ratio. Or a higher ratio may result if people tend to remain in the job for some time;
- the payment of higher rates within the range to people for market reasons, which might require recruits to start some way up the range;
- the existence of anomalies after implementing a new pay structure;
- the rate of growth of the organization - fast-growing organization might recruit more people towards the bottom of the range or, conversely, may be forced to recruit people at high points in the range because of market forces. In a more stable or stagnant organization, however, people may generally have progressed further up their ranges because of a lack of promotion opportunities.

Some differences may be entirely justified, others may need action such as accelerating or decelerating increases or exercising greater control over ratings and pay reviews
