= Performance appraisal =

Method to document and evaluate an employee's job performance

A performance appraisal (also known as a performance review, performance evaluation, career development discussion, or employee appraisal), is a periodic process where the job performance of an employee is documented and evaluated.

Performance appraisals are most often conducted by an employee's immediate manager or line manager. While extensively practiced, annual performance reviews have also been criticized as providing feedback too infrequently to be useful, and some critics argue that performance reviews in general do more harm than good. It is a principal-agent framework that describes the relationship of information between the employer and employee, in particular the direct effect and response received when a performance review is conducted.

Performance appraisals are a part of career development.

== Objectives ==
Performance appraisal, as part of a performance management system, aims to increase the efficiency of the organisation and reduce inefficiencies that arise from subordinate work that fails to align with corporate goals. Performance appraisal interviews provide feedback to employees, at the same time facilitating collaboration and discussion on pay, career development and progression, and employee discipline, clarifying the expectations of subordinates, communicating their effectiveness in achieving those goals, and ideally improving employee engagement and satisfaction. Appraisals can also enhance motivation by recognizing the contributions of employees and providing them with growth opportunities. Although they can help facilitate management-employee communication, if not executed appropriately, they may result in legal issues or instead weaken employ morale towards organizational goals and values.

Performance appraisals may increase diversity in leadership positions by ensuring fairness in hiring and promotion, particularly of individuals of socially-excluded backgrounds, especially when such appraisals are done in a culturally-sensitive manner. Such appraisals may also provide an opportunity to prevent misunderstandings that may arise, including those stemming from cultural differences. Appraisal methods are not necessarily able to be transferable cross-culturally. Labor unions provide a platform against the misuse of appraisals to reinforce managerial bias or justify unfair terminations, particularly of marginalised persons. Some unions have argued that these systems be accessible to employees and their representatives, and should reflect collective efforts rather than focusing solely on individual accomplishments, as collaboration is key in creating an inclusive public workforce.

Some management theorists have argued that performance appraisals are crucial for manager in sales and other departments or industries. In the public sector, the usage of performance appraisals may further align with public-service values of transparency and accountability.

== Implementation ==
A performance appraisal is a systematic, general and periodic process that assesses an individual employee's job performance and productivity in relation to certain pre-established criteria and organizational objectives. Other aspects of individual employees are considered as well, such as organizational citizenship behavior, accomplishments, potential for future improvement, strengths and weaknesses. There are three main methods of data collection: objective production, personnel, and judgmental evaluation. Judgmental evaluations are the most commonly used with a large variety of evaluation methods. Historically, appraisals have been conducted annually (long-cycle appraisals); however, many companies are moving towards shorter cycles, and some have been moving into short-cycle (weekly, bi-weekly) appraisals.

The use of multi-source feedback – incorporating evaluations from peers, subordinates, and customers – over traditional supervisory ratings may assist to improve rating accuracy by reducing leniency bias and centrality bias. Transparent appraisal systems reduce the risk of surprise negative evaluations, a concern especially pertinent for socially excluded groups that may already face systemic bias in the workplace. Cognitive biases such as the anchoring effect and halo effect can impact the accuracy of appraisals used to identify training and professional development needs by relying too heavily on initial information when making judgments or a rater's overall positive impression of an individual, both of which can influence the assessment of performance, leading to biased judgments that influence evaluations. Researchers have found that the organizational citizenship behavioral dimensions of altruism and civic virtue can have just as much of an impact on manager's subjective evaluations of employees' performances as employees' objective productivity levels.

Performance appraisal systems serve the purpose of documenting appraisal processes and results. Proper documentation ensures performance is recorded transparently, safeguarding all parties in case of disputes around wrongful termination or discrimination.

=== Characteristics ===
Performance appraisals can provide room for discussion in the collaboration of individual and organizational goals.

=== Process ===
The performance management process begins with leadership within the organization creating a performance management policy. Theorists such as Peter Drucker have argued that performance management and appraisal systems ought to align individual and organizational performance. Activities to support the appraisal process include suitable models of assessment, appropriately credentialed staff, employee engagement training, and improvement actions.

=== Data collection ===
- The objective production method consists of direct measures such as sales figures, production numbers, and the electronic performance monitoring of data entry workers. Although these measures deal with unambiguous criteria, they are usually incomplete and of reduced validity because the variability in performance can be due to factors outside of the employee's control, and because the quantity of production does not necessarily indicate the quality of the products.
- The personnel method is the recording of withdrawal behaviors (i.e. absenteeism, accidents). Most organizations consider unexcused absences to be indicators of poor job performance, with all other factors being equal, although this might not actually be the case in practice.
- Judgmental evaluation is the appraisal of performance by judgments of other employees, supervisors, or customers, commonly by way of rating. These tools typically take the form of a multi-format questionnaire that might include VAS, Likert scoring and the collection of both quantitative and qualitative data by a number of means. The most common types of error in collecting such data are cognitive biases and statistical errors such as leniency errors, central tendency errors, and errors resulting from the halo effect.

==== Rating methods ====
For judgmental evaluations, raters are often trained to improve the validity of the data and reduce errors. Although meaningful in theory, such training may be expensive, time-consuming, and fail to produce meaningful results.

It is not uncommon for rating inflation to occur due to raters being motivated to give higher ratings because of the lack of organizational sanction concerning accurate/inaccurate appraisals, the rater's desire to guarantee promotions or salary increases, the rater's inclination to avoid negative reactions from subordinates, and the observation that higher ratings of the ratees reflect favorably upon the rater.

The main methods used in judgmental performance appraisal are:

- Graphic rating scale: graphic rating scales are the most commonly used system in performance appraisal. On several different factors, subordinates are judged on 'how much' of that factor or trait they possess. Typically, the raters use a 5- or 7-point scale; however, there are as many as 20-point scales.
- Employee-comparison methods: rather than subordinates being judged against pre-established criteria, they are compared with one another. This method eliminates central tendency and leniency errors but still allows for halo effect errors to occur.
  - The rank-order method has raters ranking subordinates from "best" to "worst", but how truly good or bad one is on a performance dimension would be unknown.
  - The paired-comparison method requires the rater to select the two "best" subordinates out of a group on each dimension then rank individuals according to the number of times each subordinate was selected as one of the "best".
  - The forced-distribution method is good for large groups of ratees. The raters evaluate each subordinate on one or more dimensions and then place (or "force-fit") each subordinate in a 5 to 7 category normal distribution.
  - The method of top-grading can be applied to the forced distribution method. This method identifies the 10% lowest performing subordinates, as according to the forced distribution, and dismisses them leaving the 90% higher performing subordinates.
- Behavioral checklists and scales:
  - The critical incident technique concerns "specific behaviors indicative of good or bad job performance". Supervisors record behaviors of what they judge to be job performance relevant, and they keep a running tally of good and bad behaviors. A discussion on performance may then follow.
  - The behaviorally anchored rating scales (BARS) combine the critical incidents method with rating scale methods by rating performance on a scale but with the scale points being anchored by behavioral incidents. Note that BARS are job specific.
  - In the behavioral observation scale (BOS) approach to performance appraisal, employees are also evaluated in the terms of critical incidents. In that respect, it is similar to BARS. However, the BOS appraisal rate subordinates on the frequency of the critical incidents as they are observed to occur over a given period. The ratings are assigned on a five-point scale. The behavioral incidents for the rating scale are developed in the same way as for BARS through identification by supervisors or other subject matter experts. Similarly, BOS techniques meet equal employment opportunity because they are related to actual behavior required for successful job performance.
- A mixed-standard scale (MSS) is a behavior-based rating process used during employee appraisals. The scale was originally developed in Finland.

==== Stakeholders ====
So-called 360-degree feedback methods survey the customers, supervisors, and peers of employees being appraised so as to provide a more comprehensive evaluation of the employee and to potentially increase team performance and culture. Research has shown that the source of the feedback (either manager or peer) does not matter in influencing employees' subsequent behaviors after the feedback is received. Threats to both the quality and perception of feedback in peer assessment include peers being biased by pre-existing relationships and employees putting in less trust in the appraisal of a peer than a supervisor. Additionally in an organization where peer assessment is undertaken, employees may have concern for how the analysis of other is perceived, and how this may impact their own assessment in turn.

Ratings may be influenced and inflated by many non-performance factors such as employee 'likeability', personal prejudices, ease of management, and previous mistakes or successes. Marcus Buckingham and Ashley Goodall, writing in Harvard Business Review, argue, contrary to the assumptions underlying performance rating, the rating mainly measured the unique rating tendencies of the rater and thus reveals more about the rater than about the person who is rated. They referred to this as the idiosyncratic rater effect. Supervisors will sometimes rate employees more favorably than that of their true performance in order to please the employees and avoid conflict.

Performance appraisals may also involve self assessment. Threats to successful implementation of self-assessment are scarcity of time, overemphasis on scoring tools, failure to follow-up improvement actions and lack of communication. The risk of flawed self-assessment is that self-perceptions of behaviours, knowledge and skill can fail to align with the reality of an individual's performance. This can either absorb excessive management time in addressing flawed self-perceptions of performance or, if the behaviour is not addressed, can detract from the achievement of organisational goals. Therefore, evolved reflective skills are essential to successful self-assessment.

According to a meta-analysis of 27 field studies, general employee participation in their own appraisal process was positively correlated with employee reactions to the performance appraisals system. More specifically, employee participation in the appraisal process was most strongly related to employee satisfaction with the performance appraisal system. Concerning the reliability of employee reaction measures, researchers have found employee reaction scales to be sound with few concerns through using a confirmatory factor analysis that is representative of employee reaction scales.

==== Frequency ====
Some propose that the purpose of performance appraisals and the frequency of their feedback are contingent upon the nature of the job and characteristics of the employee. For example, employees of routine jobs where performance maintenance is the goal would benefit sufficiently from annual performance appraisalfeedback. On the other hand, employees of more discretionary and non-routine jobs, where goal-setting is appropriate and there is room for development, would benefit from more frequent performance appraisal feedback. Informal performance appraisals may be done more often, to prevent the element of surprise from the formal appraisal. To improve the effectiveness and value of the performance appraisal process, many organizations have adopted a continuous performance management practice. This takes the form of regular – weekly or monthly – manager-employee check-ins and informal performance discussions.

==== Interview ====
The performance appraisal interview is typically the final step of the appraisal process. The interview is held between the subordinate and supervisor. The performance appraisal interview can be considered of great significance to an organization's performance appraisal system. It is most advantageous when both the superior and subordinate participate in the interview discussion and establish goals together. Three factors consistently contribute to effective performance appraisal interviews: the supervisor's knowledge of the subordinate's job and performance in it, the supervisor's support of the subordinate, and a welcoming of the subordinate's participation.

=== Technology ===
Computers have been playing an increasing role in performance appraisal for some time, through electronic monitoring of performance, which affords the ability to record a huge amount of data on multiple dimensions of work performance, and the recording and aggregating performance ratings and written observations and making the information available on-line.

=== Challenges ===
Lack of support from higher management can undermine raters' confidence and their ability to conduct employee performance appraisal effectively, which can compromise the independence and integrity of performance appraisal decision-making. Employees often rely on higher management to validate the organization's decisions. When higher management emphasizes the importance of performance appraisals by providing endorsements, resources, training, and time for participation, it can motivate raters to be more accountable and thorough in conducting accurate appraisals. However, political and institutional factors, such as, political ideologies, norms, and organizational culture can influence the effective implementation of performance appraisal outcomes.

== Efficacy ==
There is a general consensus in academic scholarship that performance appraisals lead to positive implications for organizations, including improving organisational effectiveness and employee productivity, indicating identifying employee competencies, projecting future job performance. At the same time, a scientist-practitioner gap has been noted between the academic consensus and the experiences of industry practitioners. Feedback from performance appraisals may aid in minimizing employees' perceptions of uncertainty and promote trust within an organization. Research has found that face-to-face discussions and continuous feedback help improve the performance appraisal process by enhancing clarity and mutual understanding. Research has found that clear communication of performance metrics, management support, and fair reward distribution are essential for successful reward implementation.

=== Criticism ===
It has been proposed that the use of performance appraisal systems in organizations adversely affects organizations' pursuits of quality performance. It is believed by some scholars and practitioners that the use of performance appraisals is unnecessary if there is total quality management. Employees also often have negative perceptions of performance reviews, as they can be uncomfortable, stressful, or formative of distrust in the workspace. If the person being appraised does not trust their employer, such exercises may be of no benefit. Negative outcomes concerning the organizations can result when goals are overly challenging or overemphasized to the extent of affecting ethics, legal requirements, or quality. Moreover, challenging performance goals can impede an employee's abilities to acquire necessary knowledge and skills. The skepticism is also reflected in the decline in the use of traditional performance appraisal processes in the U.S. corporate sector. It is estimate of a third of the U.S. private companies have now switched to a more informal and frequent engagement between managers and employees to enhance performance. The shift is attributed to a greater focus on talent development, business agility, and a preference for teamwork over individual responsibility.

Academic literature has also been unable to appropriately define exclusive measures of performance appraisal effectiveness. Flawed performance standards or measures are attributed to the use of subjective criteria or ambiguous measures by raters during performance appraisals, due to the difficulty in defining objective performance standards due to the complexity and diversity of job tasks and outcomes. Empirical findings suggest that subordinates with a high degree of job autonomy may have a positive relationship with the inclusion of subjective measures in their performance appraisals, due to the variation of day-to-day job tasks need to meet performance targets.

Studies also suggest cognitive biases and dual-process theory errors, as well as motivation and personal relationships, play a substantive role in influencing ratings. In the 2005 Merit Performance Survey conducted by the United States (U.S.) Merit Systems Protection Board (MSPB), 16.41% of federal supervisors reported that they had rated their employees' performance appraisals either higher or lower than the employees should have received. Among nine potential problems identified in the 2005 MPS on structure and operation of the U.S. federal government appraisal system; inflated ratings, flawed standards, and lack of support were ranked as the top three problems, respectively. Research shows that managers tend to give better ratings to subordinates they favor, influenced by both direct bias and indirect bias. Inflated ratings are more common when performance appraisals are conducted for judgmental and administrative purposes, such as promotions, pay increases, or job retention, rather than for developmental reasons.

Government departments and public service organizations often face challenges in developing clear organizational goals, which makes it further challenging for managers evaluate the performance of subordinates based on individual performance goals that are not clearly aligned to organizational goals.

== Legal implications ==
When performance appraisals are not carried out appropriately, legal issues could result that place the organization at risk. Performance appraisals are used in organizational disciplinary programs as well as for promotional decisions within the organization. The improper application and utilization of performance appraisals can affect employees negatively and lead to legal action against the organization.

There are federal laws addressing fair employment practices, and this also concerns performance appraisal. Discrimination can occur within predictions of performance and evaluations of job behaviors. The revision of many court cases has revealed the involvement of alleged discrimination which was often linked to the assessment of the employee's job performance. Some of the laws which protect individuals against discrimination include Title VII of the Civil Rights Act of 1964, the Civil Rights Act of 1991, the Age Discrimination in Employment Act (ADEA), and the Americans with Disabilities Act (ADA). Lawsuits may also result from charges of an employer's negligence, defamation, or misrepresentation. Appraisal criteria for legally sound performance appraisals include appraisal that is objective, job-related, behavior-based, within the control of the ratee, and related to specific functions rather than a global assessment. Some appraisal procedure suggestions for legally sound performance appraisals to standardize operations, communicate formally with employees, provide information of performance deficits and give opportunities to employees to correct those deficits, give employees access to appraisal results, provide written instructions for the training of raters, and use multiple, diverse and unbiased raters.

The Employment Opportunity Commission (EEOC) guidelines apply to any selection procedure that is used for making employment decisions, not only for hiring, but also for promotion, demotion, transfer, layoff, discharge, or early retirement. Therefore, employment appraisal procedures must be validated like tests or any other selection device. Employers who base their personnel decisions on the results of a well-designed performance review program that includes formal appraisal interviews are much more likely to be successful in defending themselves against claims of discrimination.

== Cross-cultural implications ==
Performance appraisal (PA) systems, and the premises of which they were based, that have been formed and regarded as effective in the United States may not have the transferability for effectual utilization in other countries or cultures, and vice versa. Performance "appraisal is thought to be deeply rooted in the norms, values, and beliefs of a society". "Appraisal reflects attitudes towards motivation and performance (self) and relationships (e.g. peers, subordinates, supervisors, organization), all of which vary from one country to the next". Therefore, appraisal should be in conjunction with cultural norms, values, and beliefs in order to be operative. The deep-seated norms, values and beliefs in different cultures affect employee motivation and perception of organizational equity and justice. In effect, a performance appraisal system created and considered effectual in one country may not be an appropriate assessment in another cultural region.

For example, some countries and cultures value the trait of assertiveness and personal accomplishment while others instead place more merit on cooperation and interpersonal connection. Countries scoring high on assertiveness consider performance appraisalto be a way of assuring equity among employees so that higher performing employees receive greater rewards or higher salaries. Countries scoring low on assertiveness but higher in interpersonal relations may not like the social separation and pay inequity of higher/lower performing employees; employees from this more cooperative rather than individualistic culture place more concern on interpersonal relationships with other employees rather than on individual interests. High assertive countries value performance feedback for self-management and effectiveness purposes while countries low in assertiveness view performance feedback as "threatening and obtrusive". In this case, the performance appraisalof the high assertive countries would likely not be beneficial for countries scoring lower in assertiveness to employ. However, countries scoring lower in assertiveness could employ performance appraisalfor purposes of improving long-term communication development within the organization such as clarifying job objectives, guide training and development plans, and lessen the gap between job performance and organizational expectations.

== See also ==
- Behavioral risk management
- Employee motivation
- Employment integrity testing
- Employment law
- Human resource development
- Human resource management
- Industrial and organizational psychology
- Industrial sociology
- Job analysis
- Job satisfaction
- Organizational commitment
- Organizational socialization
- Performance paradox
- Performance rating (work measurement)
- Personnel psychology
- Personnel selection
- Quality of working life
- Realistic job preview
- Systems psychology
- Work motivation

== Sources ==
- Cardy, Robert L.; Dobbins, Gregory H. (1994). Performance Appraisal: Alternative Perspectives. South-Western Publishing Company. ISBN 978-0-538-81383-9.
- Gomez-Mejia, Luis R.; Balkin, David; Cardy, Robert (2011). Managing Human Resources. Pearson Higher Ed. ISBN 978-0-13-299823-9.
- Grote, Richard C. (2002). The Performance Appraisal Question and Answer Book: A Survival Guide for Managers. American Management Association. ISBN 978-0-8144-2669-2.
- Hofstede, Geert (2001). Culture's Consequences: Comparing Values, Behaviors, Institutions and Organizations Across Nations. SAGE. ISBN 978-0-8039-7324-4.
- Howes, Satoris S.; Muchinsky, Paul M. (2022). Psychology Applied to Work: An Introduction to Industrial and Organizational Psychology. Hypergraphic Press, Incorporated. ISBN 978-0-9749345-5-6.
- Mathis, Robert L.; Jackson, John Harold (2003). Human Resource Management. Thomson/South-western. ISBN 978-0-324-07151-1.
- Schultz, Duane P.; Schultz, Sydney Ellen (2010). Psychology and Work Today: An Introduction to Industrial and Organizational Psychology. Prentice Hall. ISBN 978-0-205-68358-1.
- Smart, Bradford D. (1999). Topgrading: How Leading Companies Win by Hiring, Coaching, and Keeping the Best People. Prentice Hall Press. ISBN 978-0-7352-0049-4.
