= George Bohrnstedt =

American sociologist, statistician, and education researcher

George William Bohrnstedt (born September 28, 1938, Arcadia, WI) is an American sociologist, statistician, and education researcher.

== Biography ==
Bohrnstedt received his PhD from University of Wisconsin-Madison in 1966 under the supervision of Edgar F. Borgatta. He spent most of his 20-year academic career at the University of Minnesota-Twin Cities and Indiana University-Bloomington and was chair of the Department of Sociology at both universities. In 1988 he moved to the American Institutes for Research where he was active as Senior Vice-president and Institute Fellow until his retirement in March of 2025.

One of his statistics articles "On the exact covariance of products of random variables" (with Arthur S. Goldberger) which appeared in the Journal of the American Statistical Association has been cited in research articles in areas as diverse as psychology, chemistry, electrical engineering, forestry, operations research, and genetics.

His textbook Statistics for Social Data Analysis co-authored with David Knoke (and Alicia Potter Mee for the 4th edition) is widely cited and was used in the teaching of upper level first year graduate level statistics courses. He also co-edited Sociological Methodology: 1969 with Edgar F. Borgatta) and the two of them were also the founding editors of Sociological Methods and Research. He was also served the editor of Social Psychology Quarterly from 1979 to 1982.

Bohrnstedt was also the leader and clarinetist with the Riverboat Ramblers, a popular traditional band that regularly played venues in the Madison, Milwaukee, and Lake Geneva areas of Wisconsin in the 1960s.
