= Psychosocial safety climate =

Organisational psychology term

Psychosocial safety climate (PSC) is a term used in organisational psychology that refers to the shared belief held by workers that their psychological health and safety are protected and supported by senior management. PSC builds on other work stress theories and concerns the corporate climate for worker psychological health and safety. Studies have found that a favourable PSC is associated with low rates of absenteeism and high productivity, while a poor climate is linked to high levels of workplace stress and job dissatisfaction. PSC can be promoted by organisational practices, policies and procedures that prioritise the psychosocial safety and wellbeing of workers. The theory has implications for the design of workplaces for the best possible outcomes for both workers and management.

== The PSC theory ==
PSC theory is a work stress theory in the field of workplace health and safety and organisational psychology. PSC refers to the shared perceptions of employees of their organisation's "systems, policies, practices and procedures for the protection of worker psychological health and safety". PSC largely reflects management values regarding the psychological health of workers.

PSC theory is that when senior management value and prioritise worker psychological health and safety, corporate decisions are made to provide and design work that is meaningful, manageable, amply resourced and free from psychosocial risks. Numerous work stress theories exist within occupational health psychology, work and organisational psychology, and work health and safety disciplines (Job Demands-Resources Theory; Job Demand Control Theory). These are major job design theories that emphasize that work stress arises largely from the way work is designed ('the cause'), such as when the requirements of the job (demands) outweigh one's capacity to perform with the resources available, job stress occurs.

PSC predicts future work design, such as the level of demands a worker will be exposed to and the amount of resources that will be available to carry out job tasks. PSC is therefore proposed as a 'cause of the causes' of work stress, a cause of stressful work design and other work conditions.

== Four subsystems of psychosocial safety climate ==
Psychosocial safety climate is composed of four subsystems:

1. Management commitment: Senior management demonstrate a commitment to stress prevention through support and involvement.
2. Management priority: Senior management prioritises the health and safety of their employees over productivity goals.
3. Organisational communication: Organisations provide safe and usable channels for communication and listen to the concerns of all their members.
4. Organisational participation: All levels of the organisation (e.g., unions, occupational health and safety representatives, employees, and management) participate and consult on protecting and promoting the psychological health and safety of staff.

== PSC Level, PSC Strength and PSC Ideal Concepts ==
Understanding the PSC climate of an organisation or group involves considering important concepts such as PSC Level, PSC Strength, and PSC Ideal. As mentioned earlier, PSC (Level) is a climate concept that reflects shared employee perceptions and is evaluated by combining individual perceptions of the climate of the organisation or work group. PSC scholars have used the PSC score at a group level (average or mean) to account for PSC's group-level nature. However, a group may have varied perceptions, and climate strength indicates the degree of agreement among employees on the climate within a team or organisation. Low climate strength implies that employees are receiving conflicting messages, while a high degree of within-group agreement suggests a strong climate that sends clear messages about management concern for worker psychological health, via relevant policies, practices and procedures. The concept of PSC Strength refers to the average level of variability in individual PSC perceptions. It is calculated as the standard deviation multiplied by -1. By considering both the PSC Level and Strength, we can calculate the PSC Ideal index, which is obtained by dividing the PSC Mean level by the Standard Deviation. The most favourable PSC context is characterised by a high PSC Level and Strength, resulting in a high PSC Ideal score.

== Relation to other concepts ==
PSC is related to safety culture, perceived organizational support, and psychological safety but is a distinct construct. Safety climate concerns the climate that protects workers from accidents and injuries and emphasizes safe systems and safe worker behavior.

- Safety climate concerns the climate that protects workers from accidents and injuries and emphasizes safe systems and safe worker behaviour.
- Perceived organizational social support, refers to the extent that the organization cares about employee well-being, but this construct does not concern the values and systems required to protect worker psychological health.
- Psychological safety climate refers to the "shared belief held by a work team that the team is safe for interpersonal risk taking." Workers who experience a team environment that is psychologically safe are free to engage in risk-taking behavior that is necessary for learning and performance. The construct is not motivated by concern for worker psychological health in and of itself.

== Evidence ==
PSC research has been undertaken in Australia, New Zealand, Malaysia, Japan, China, Iran, Ghana, Vietnam, Netherlands, Norway, Germany, Portugal, India, Sweden, France, Canada, US, and Spain, across many industries/occupations. Evidence shows that PSC predicts workplace psychosocial risks and health and productivity outcomes.

=== PSC and health and work outcomes ===
PSC predicts psychological distress and emotional exhaustion, depression, exhaustion and cynicism, sickness absence, presenteeism, work engagement, and workers' compensation claims for physical injuries, work injuries, injury underreporting, stress-related concerns reporting, safety behaviors and performance and turnover intention.

- British Medical Journal publication shows that poor PSC increases the risk of developing new depressive symptoms within one year by 3 times, or 200%.
- A 10% increase in PSC should lead to a 4% decrease in job demands, a 4.5% decrease in burnout, an 8% increase in job resources and a 6% increase in engagement.
- Elimination of low range PSC in Australian workplaces could lead to a 14% reduction in job strain, and a 13% reduction in worker depression.
- Elimination of low and mid-range PSC could lead to a 43% reduction in sickness absence and a 72% reduction in presenteeism.
- The national annual cost to organisations from presenteeism and absenteeism attributable to low PSC in Australian workplaces is $6 billion.
- A medium-sized business with 100 employees and poor PSC could expect to save over $180,000 in lost productivity per year by improving their organisation to meet high PSC benchmarks, based on a difference of $1,887 per employee between low and high PSC organisations.
- In an organisation of 1000 workers if employees in high/medium risk moved to low risk PSC savings would be $1.18 million per annum due to reduced days off (still allows for 6.28 days off on average per employee.

=== Intervention research ===
Studies show that PSC can change through organizational and individual interventions. Participative organizational intervention research shows significant improvements in PSC within a 4-month period for interventions aimed to tackle work stressors focusing on the PSC principles.

== Work health and safety implications ==
PSC concerns the system of psychosocial risk management in organizations and covers crucial elements of the NSW SafeWork Code of Practice 2021 and Australian WHS regulations. The fundamentals of a psychosocial risk management system are captured by PSC. PSC has been used as an evidence-based evaluation indicator for the Australian WHS policy change. The Regulatory Impact Statement concerning WorkSafe Victoria's 2022 proposed amendments to the Occupational Health and Safety Regulations 2017 to improve workplace mental health, indicates that PSC could be used as an indicator for future policy evaluation efforts.

== See also ==
- Job demands-resources model
- Occupational health psychology
