= Performance rating (work measurement) =

Performance rating is the step in the work measurement in which the analyst observes the worker's performance and records a value representing that performance relative to the analyst's concept of standard performance.

Performance rating helps people do their jobs better, identifies training and education needs, assigns people to work they can excel in, and maintains fairness in salaries, benefits, promotion, hiring, and firing. Most workers want to know how they are doing on the job. Workers need performance feedback to work effectively. Accessing an employee timely, accurate, constructive feedback is key to effective performance. Motivational strategies such as goal setting depend upon regular performance updates. There are many sources of error with performance ratings, and error can be reduced through rater training and through the use of behaviorally anchored rating scales. In industrial and organizational psychology such scales are used to clearly define the behaviors that constitute poor, average, and superior performance.

There are several methods of performance rating. The simplest and most common method is based on speed or pace. Dexterity and effectiveness are also important considerations when assessing performance. Standard performance is denoted as 100. A performance rating greater than 100 means the worker's performance is more than standard, and less than 100 means the worker's performance is less than standard. Standard performance is not necessarily the performance level expected of workers. For example, a standard performance rating of a worker walking is 4.5 miles/hour. The rating is used in conjunction with a timing study to level out actual time (observed time) taken by the worker under observation. This leads to a basic minute value (observed time/100*rating). This balances out fast and slow workers to get to a standard/average time. Standard at a 100 is not a percentage, it simply makes the calculations easier. Most companies that set targets using work study methods will set it at a level of around 85, not 100.

== Attributions to work performance ==
Performance rating has become a continuous process by which an employer and employees attempt to understand company goals and how his or her progress toward contributing to them are measured. Performance measurement is an ongoing activity for all managers and their subordinates. A performance measurement uses the following indicators:

- Quantity: addresses how much work is produced. A quantity measure can be expressed as an error rate, such as number one percentage of errors allowable per unit of work, or as a general result to be achieved.
- Quality: address how well the work is performed and/or how accurate or how effective the final product is.
- Timeliness: addresses how quickly, when or by what date the work is produced. The most common error made in setting timeliness standards is to allow no margin for error. As with other standards, timeliness standards should be set realistically in view of other performance requirements and needs of the organization.
- Cost-effectiveness: addresses dollar savings to the organization or working within a budget. Standards that address cost-effectiveness should be based on specific resource levels (money, personnel, or time) that generally can be documented and measured in agencies' annual fiscal year budgets. Cost-effectiveness standards may include such aspects of performance as maintaining or reducing unit costs, reducing the time it takes to produce a product or service, or reducing waste.
- Absenteeism/tardiness: addresses the ability for employee to show up at work and on time. How it is affecting their work performance and other employees.
- Adherence to policy: addresses deviation from policy and performance goals.
- Professional appearance: addresses how well employees conduct themselves in the work place and comply with dress code/working environment.

== Effectiveness of performance rating ==
The purpose of performance rating is to provide systematic evaluation of the employees’ contribution to the organization. Globally, the combination of indicators and performance management, combined with intensifying work, transforms the work of employees and of the managers. On the managerial level, the will of hierarchy to fulfill performance indicators is dependent on task prioritizing, which is not shared amongst everyone.

Performance Rating intensifies the environment of the organization but provides structure for production. Performance satisfaction is found to be directly related to both affective commitment and intention of employee. If motivated more likely to meet goals.

== See also ==
- Performance appraisal
