= Person analysis =

Person analysis is a phase of training needs analysis directed at identifying which individuals within an organization should receive training and what training they should receive.

A person analysis identifies individuals who are not meeting the desired performance requirements or goals.
