= Control (management) =

Function of management which helps to check errors in order to take corrective actions

Control is a function of management that assists in identifying errors and taking the proper corrective actions. Simply, it ensures that activities are performed properly and without error.

According to modern concepts, control is a proactive action since earlier concepts of control were only used when errors were detected. Control in management includes setting standards, measuring performance, and taking corrective action in decision-making.

== Definition ==
In 1916, Henri Fayol formulated one of the first definitions of control as it pertains to management:

Control of an undertaking consists of seeing that everything is being carried out in accordance with the plan which has been adopted, the orders which have been given, and the principles which have been laid down. Its objective is to point out mistakes so that they may be rectified and prevented from recurring.

According to E. F. L. Brech:

Control is checking current performance against pre-determined standards contained in the plans, with a view to ensuring adequate progress and satisfactory performance.

According to Harold Koontz:

Controlling is the measurement and correction of performance to make sure that enterprise objectives and the plans devised to attain them are accomplished.

According to Stafford Beer:

Management is the profession of control.

According to Robert J. Mockler, who presented a more comprehensive definition of managerial control:

Management control can be defined as a systematic effort by business management to compare performance to predetermined standards, plans, or objectives in order to determine whether performance is in line with these standards and presumably in order to take any remedial action required to see that human and other corporate resources are being used in the most effective and efficient way possible in achieving corporate objectives.

— Robert J. Mockler, Readings in Management Control, p. 14

The control subsystem functions in close harmony with the operating system. The degree to which they interact depends on the nature of the operating system and its objectives. Stability refers to a system's ability to maintain a pattern of output without wide fluctuations. The rapidity of response pertains to the speed with which a system can correct variations and return to the expected output.

A political election can illustrate the concept of control and the importance of feedback. Each party organizes a campaign to get its candidate selected and outlines a plan to inform the public about both the candidate's credentials and the party's platform. As the election nears, opinion polls furnish feedback about the effectiveness of the campaign and about each candidate's chances of winning. Depending on the nature of this feedback, certain adjustments in strategy and/or tactics can be made in an attempt to achieve the desired result.

From these definitions, it can be stated that there is a close link between planning and controlling. Planning is a process by which an organization's objectives and the methods to achieve the objectives are established, and controlling is a process that measures and directs the actual performance against the planned goals of the organization. Thus, goals and objectives are often referred to as Siamese twins of management. The managerial function of management is the measurement and correction of performance to make sure that enterprise objectives and the goals devised to attain them are accomplished.

The absence of a right to control the actions or working practices of person engaged at work is generally an indication that the working relationship with that person is covered by a contract for services and is not a form of employment.

== Characteristics ==
- Control is a continuous process
- Control is closely linked with planning
- Control is a tool for achieving organizational activities
- Control is an end-to-end process
- Control compares actual performance with planned performance*
- Control points out the error in the execution process
- Control minimizes cost
- Control achieves the standard
- Control saves time
- Control helps management monitor performance
- Control compares performance against standards
- Control is action oriented

== Elements ==
The four basic elements in a control system are:

1. the characteristic or condition to be controlled
2. the sensor
3. the comparator
4. the activator

They occur in the same sequence and maintain consistent relationships with each other in every system.

The first element is the characteristic or condition of the operating system to be measured. Specific characteristics are selected because a correlation exists between them and the system's performance. A characteristic can be the output of the system during any stage of processing (e.g. the heat energy produced by a furnace), or it may be a condition that is the result of the system (e.g. the temperature in the room which has changed because of the heat generated by the furnace). In an elementary school system, the hours a teacher works or the gain in knowledge demonstrated by the students on a national examination are examples of characteristics that may be selected for measurement, or control.

The second element of control, the sensor, is a means for measuring the characteristic. For example, in a home heating system, this device would be the thermostat, and in a quality-control system, this measurement might be performed by a visual inspection of the product.

The third element of control, the comparator, determines the need for correction by comparing what is occurring with what has been planned. Some deviation from the plan is usual and expected, but when variations are beyond those considered acceptable, corrective action is required. It involves a sort of preventative action that indicates that good control is being achieved.

The fourth element of control, the activator, is the corrective action taken to return the system to its expected output. The actual person, device, or method used to direct corrective inputs into the operating system may take a variety of forms. It may be a hydraulic controller positioned by a solenoid or electric motor in response to an electronic error signal, an employee directed to rework the parts that failed to pass quality inspection, or a school principal who decides to buy additional books to provide for an increased number of students. As long as a plan is performed within allowable limits, corrective action is not necessary; however, this seldom occurs in practice.

Information is the medium of control, because the flow of sensory data and later the flow of corrective information allow a characteristic or condition of the system to be controlled.

=== Controlled characteristic or condition ===
The primary requirement of a control system is that it maintains the level and kind of output necessary to achieve the system's objectives. It is usually impractical to control every feature and condition associated with the system's output. Therefore, the choice of the controlled item (and appropriate information about it) is extremely important. There should be a direct correlation between the controlled item and the system's operation. In other words, control of the selected characteristic should have a direct relationship to the goal or objective of the system.

=== Sensor ===
After the characteristic is sensed, or measured, information pertinent to control is fed back. Exactly what information needs to be transmitted and also the language that will best facilitate the communication process and reduce the possibility of distortion in transmission must be carefully considered. Information that is to be compared with the standard, or plan, should be expressed in the same terms or language as in the original plan to facilitate decision making. Using machine methods (computers) may require extensive translation of the information. Since optimal languages for computation and for human review are not always the same, the relative ease of translation may be a significant factor in selecting the units of measurement or the language unit in the sensing element.

In many instances, the measurement may be sampled rather than providing a complete and continuous feedback of information about the operation. A sampling procedure suggests measuring some segment or portion of the operation that will represent the total.

=== Comparison with standard ===
In a social system, the norms of acceptable behavior become the standard against which so-called deviant behavior may be judged. Regulations and laws provide a more formal collection of information for society. Social norms change, but very slowly. In contrast, the standards outlined by a formal law can be changed from one day to the next through revision, discontinuation, or replacement by another. Information about deviant behavior becomes the basis for controlling social activity. Output information is compared with the standard or norm and significant deviations are noted. In an industrial example, frequency distribution (a tabulation of the number of times a given characteristic occurs within the sample of products being checked) may be used to show the average quality, the spread, and the comparison of output with a standard.

If there is a significant difference between output and plan that cannot be corrected, the system is "out of control." This means that the objectives of the system are not feasible in relation to the capabilities of the present design. Either the objectives must be re-evaluated or the system redesigned to add new capacity or capability. For example, drug trafficking has been increasing in some cities at an alarming rate. The citizens must decide whether to revise the police system so as to regain control, or whether to modify the law to reflect a different norm of acceptable behavior.

=== Implementor ===
The activator unit responds to the information received from the comparator and initiates corrective action. If the system is a machine-to-machine system, the corrective inputs (decision rules) are designed into the network. When the control relates to a man-to-machine or man-to-man system, however, the individual(s) in charge must evaluate: (1) the accuracy of the feedback information, (2) the significance of the variation, and (3) what corrective inputs will restore the system to a reasonable degree of stability. Once the decision has been made to direct new inputs into the system, the actual process may be relatively easy. A small amount of energy can change the operation of jet airplanes, automatic steel mills, and hydroelectric power plants. The pilot presses a button, and the landing gear of the airplane goes up or down; the operator of a steel mill pushes a lever, and a ribbon of white-hot steel races through the plant; a worker at a control board directs the flow of electrical energy throughout a regional network of stations and substations. It takes but a small amount of control energy to release or stop large quantities of input.

The comparator may be located far from the operating system, although at least some of the elements must be in close proximity to operations. For example, the measurement (the sensory element) is usually at the point of operations. The measurement information can be transmitted to a distant point for comparison with the standard (comparator), and when deviations occur, the correcting input can be released from the distant point. However, the input (activator) will be located at the operating system. This ability to control from afar means that aircraft can be flown by remote control, dangerous manufacturing processes can be operated from a safe distance, and national organizations can be directed from centralized headquarters in Dublin, Ireland.

— Kenard E. White

== Process ==
Step 1. Establishment of Standard.

Standards are the criteria against which actual performance will be measured. Standards are set in both quantitative and qualitative terms.

Step 2. Measurement of actual performance

Performance is measured in an objective and reliable manner. It should be checked in the same unit in which the standards are set.

Step 3. Comparing actual performance with standards.

This step involves comparing the actual performance with standards laid down in order to find the deviations. For example, performance of a salesman in terms of unit sold in a week can be easily measured against the standard output for the week.

Step 4. Analysis the cause of deviations.

Managers must determine why standards were not met. This step also involves determining whether more control is necessary or if the standard should be changed.

Step 5. Taking corrective action.

After the reasons for deviations have been determined, managers can then develop solutions for issues with meeting the standards and make changes to processes or behaviors.

== Classifications ==
Control may be grouped according to three general classifications:

1. the nature of the information flow designed into the system (open- or closed-loop control)
2. the kind of components included in the design (man or machine control systems)
3. the relationship of control to the decision process (organizational or operational control).

=== Open and closed-loop control ===
A street-lighting system controlled by a timing device is an example of an open-loop system. At a certain time each evening, a mechanical device closes the circuit and energy flows through the electric lines to light the lamps. Note, however, that the timing mechanism is an independent unit and is not measuring the objective function of the lighting system. If the lights should be needed on a dark, stormy day the timing device would not recognize this need and therefore would not activate energy inputs. Corrective properties may sometimes be built into the controller (for example, to modify the time the lights are turned on as the days grow shorter or longer), but this would not close the loop. In another instance, the sensing, comparison, or adjustment may be made through action taken by an individual who is not part of the system. For example, the lights may be turned on by someone who happens to pass by and recognizes the need for additional light.

If control is exercised as a result of the operation rather than because of outside or predetermined arrangements, it is a closed-loop system. A home thermostat is an example of a control device in a closed-loop system. When the room temperature drops below the desired point, the control mechanism closes the circuit to start the furnace and the temperature rises. The furnace is deactivated as the temperature reaches the preselected level. The significant difference between this type of system and an open-loop system is that the control device is an element of the system it serves and measures the performance of the system. In other words, all four control elements are integral to the specific system.

An essential part of a closed-loop system is feedback; that is, the output of the system is measured continually through the item controlled, and the input is modified to reduce any difference or error toward zero. Many of the patterns of information flow in organizations are found to have the nature of closed loops, which use feedback. The reason for such a condition is apparent when one recognizes that any system, if it is to achieve a predetermined goal, must have available to it at all times an indication of its degree of attainment. In general, every goal-seeking system employs feedback.

=== Human and machine control ===
The elements of control are easy to identify in machine systems. For example, the characteristic to be controlled might be some variable like speed or temperature, and the sensing device could be a speedometer or a thermometer. An expectation of precision exists because the characteristic is quantifiable and the standard and the normal variation to be expected can be described in exact terms. In automatic machine systems, inputs of information are used in a process of continual adjustment to achieve output specifications. When even a small variation from the standard occurs, the correction process begins. The automatic system is highly structured, designed to accept certain kinds of input and produce specific output, and programmed to regulate the transformation of inputs within a narrow range of variation.

For an illustration of mechanical control: as the load on a steam engine increases and the engine starts to slow down, the regulator reacts by opening a valve that releases additional inputs of steam energy. This new input returns the engine to the desired number of revolutions per minute. This type of mechanical control is crude in comparison to the more sophisticated electronic control systems in everyday use. Consider the complex missile-guidance systems that measure the actual course according to predetermined mathematical calculations and make almost instantaneous corrections to direct the missile to its target.

Machine systems can be complex because of the sophisticated technology, whereas control of people is complex because the elements of control are difficult to determine. In human control systems, the relationship between objectives and associated characteristics is often vague; the measurement of the characteristic may be extremely subjective; the expected standard is difficult to define; and the amount of new inputs required is impossible to quantify. To illustrate, let us refer once more to a formalized social system in which deviant behaviour is controlled through a process of observed violation of the existing law (sensing), court hearings and trials (comparison with standard), incarceration when the accused is found guilty (correction), and release from custody after rehabilitation of the individual has occurred.

The speed limit established for freeway driving is one standard of performance that is quantifiable, but even in this instance, the degree of permissible variation and the amount of the actual variation are often a subject of disagreement between the patrolman and the suspected violator. The complexity of society is reflected in many laws and regulations, which establish the general standards for economic, political, and social operations. A citizen may not know or understand the law and consequently would not know whether or not he was guilty of a violation.

Most organized systems are some combination of man and machine; some elements of control may be performed by machine whereas others are accomplished by man. In addition, some standards may be precisely structured whereas others may be little more than general guidelines with wide variations expected in output. Man must act as the controller when measurement is subjective and judgment is required. Machines such as computers are incapable of making exceptions from the specified control criteria regardless of how much a particular case might warrant special consideration. A pilot acts in conjunction with computers and automatic pilots to fly large jets. In the event of unexpected weather changes, or possible collision with another plane, he must intercede and assume direct control.

=== Organizational and operational control ===
The concept of organizational control is implicit in the bureaucratic theory of Max Weber. Associated with this theory are such concepts as "span of control", "closeness of supervision", and "hierarchical authority". Weber's view tends to include all levels or types of organizational control as being the same. Other writers have tended to differentiate the control process between that which emphasizes the nature of the organizational or systems design and that which deals with daily operations. The performance of a system is "evaluated" to determine effectiveness and efficiency in the design or failure. The system is operated and "controlled" with respect to the daily inputs of material, information, and energy. In both instances, the elements of feedback are present, but organizational control tends to review and evaluate the nature and arrangement of components in the system, whereas operational control tends to adjust the daily inputs.

The direction for organizational control comes from the goals and strategic plans of the organization. General plans are translated into specific performance measures such as share of the market, earnings, return on investment, and budgets. The process of organizational control is to review and evaluate the performance of the system against these established norms. Rewards for meeting or exceeding standards may range from special recognition to salary increases or promotions. On the other hand, a failure to meet expectations may signal the need to reorganize or redesign.

In organizational control, the approach used in the program of review and evaluation depends on the reason for the evaluation — that is, is it because the system is not effective (accomplishing its objectives)? Is the system failing to achieve an expected standard of efficiency? Is the evaluation being conducted because of a breakdown or failure in operations? Is it merely a periodic audit-and-review process?

When a system has failed or is in great difficulty, special diagnostic techniques may be required to isolate the trouble areas and to identify the causes of the difficulty. It is appropriate to investigate areas that have been troublesome before or areas where some measure of performance can be quickly identified. For example, if an organization's output backlog builds rapidly, it is logical to check first to see if the problem is due to such readily obtainable measures as increased demand or to a drop in available man hours. When a more detailed analysis is necessary, a systematic procedure should be followed.

In contrast to organizational control, operational control serves to regulate the day-to-day output relative to schedules, specifications, and costs. Is the output of product or service the proper quality and is it available as scheduled? Are inventories of raw materials, goods-in-process, and finished products being purchased and produced in the desired quantities? Are the costs associated with the transformation process in line with cost estimates? Is the information needed in the transformation process available in the right form and at the right time? Is the energy resource being utilized efficiently?

The most difficult task of management concerns monitoring the behaviour of individuals, comparing performance to some standard, and providing rewards or punishment as indicated. Sometimes this control over people relates entirely to their output. For example, a manager might not be concerned with the behavior of a salesman as long as sales were as high as expected. In other instances, close supervision of the salesman might be appropriate if achieving customer satisfaction were one of the sales organization's main objectives.

The larger the unit, the more likely that the control characteristic will be related to some output goal. It also follows that if it is difficult or impossible to identify the actual output of individuals, it is better to measure the performance of the entire group. This means that individuals' levels of motivation and the measurement of their performance become subjective judgments made by the supervisor. Controlling output also suggests the difficulty of controlling individuals' performance and relating this to the total system's objectives.

== Problems ==
The perfect plan could be outlined if every possible variation of input could be anticipated and if the system would operate as predicted. This kind of planning is neither realistic, economical, nor feasible for most business systems. If it were feasible, planning requirements would be so complex that the system would be out of date before it could be operated. Therefore, we design control into systems. This requires more thought in the systems design but allows more flexibility of operations and makes it possible to operate a system using unpredictable components and undetermined input. Still, the design and effective operation of control are not without problems.

The objective of the system is to perform some specified function. The objective of organizational control is to see that the specified function is achieved. The objective of operational control is to ensure that variations in daily output are maintained within prescribed limits.

It is one thing to design a system that contains all of the elements of control, and quite another to make it operate true to the best objectives of design. Operating "in control" or "with plan" does not guarantee optimum performance. For example, the plan may not make the best use of the inputs of materials, energy, or information — in other words, the system may not be designed to operate efficiently. Some of the more typical problems relating to control include the difficulty of measurement, the problem of timing information flow, and the setting of proper standards.

When objectives are not limited to quantitative output, the measurement of system effectiveness is difficult to make and subsequently perplexing to evaluate. Many of the characteristics pertaining to output do not lend themselves to quantitative measurement. This is true particularly when inputs of human energy cannot be related directly to output. The same situation applies to machines and other equipment associated with human involvement, when output is not in specific units. In evaluating man-machine or human-oriented systems, psychological and sociological factors obviously do not easily translate into quantifiable terms. For example, how does mental fatigue affect the quality or quantity of output? And, if it does, is mental fatigue a function of the lack of a challenging assignment or the fear of a potential injury?

Subjective inputs may be transferred into numerical data, but there is always the danger of an incorrect appraisal and transfer, and the danger that the analyst may assume undue confidence in such data after they have been quantified. Let us suppose, for example, that the decisions made by an executive are rated from 1 to 10, 10 being the perfect decision. After determining the ranking for each decision, adding these, and dividing by the total number of decisions made, the average ranking would indicate a particular executive's score in his decision-making role. On the basis of this score, judgments — which could be quite erroneous — might be made about his decision-making effectiveness. One executive with a ranking of 6.75 might be considered more effective than another who had a ranking of 6.25, and yet the two managers may have made decisions under different circumstances and conditions. External factors over which neither executive had any control may have influenced the difference in "effectiveness".

Quantifying human behavior, despite its extreme difficulty, subjectivity, and imprecision in relation to measuring physical characteristics is the most prevalent and important measurement made in large systems. The behavior of individuals ultimately dictates the success or failure of every man-made system.

=== Information flow ===
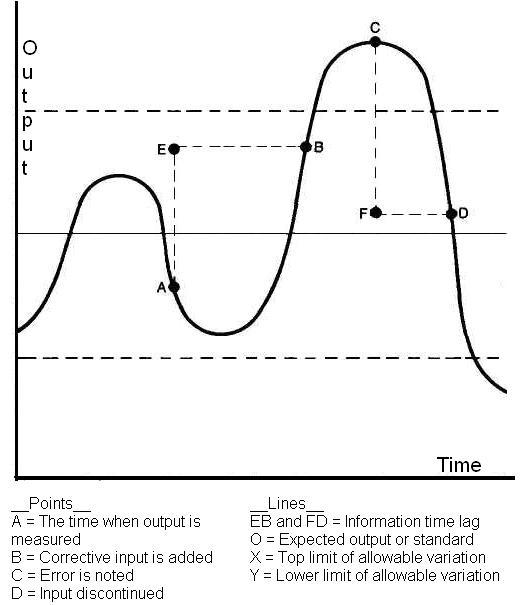
Oscillation and Feedback

Another problem of control relates to the improper timing of information introduced into the feedback channel. Improper timing can occur in both computerized and human control systems, either by mistakes in measurement or in judgment. The more rapid the system's response to an error signal, the more likely it is that the system could over adjust; yet the need for prompt action is important because any delay in providing corrective input could also be crucial. A system generating feedback inconsistent with current need will tend to fluctuate and will not adjust in the desired manner.

The most serious problem in information flow arises when the delay in feedback is exactly one-half cycle, for then the corrective action is superimposed on a variation from norm which, at that moment, is in the same direction as that of the correction. This causes the system to overcorrect, and then if the reverse adjustment is made out of cycle, to correct too much in the other direction, and so on until the system fluctuates ("oscillates") out of control. This phenomenon is illustrated in Figure 1. "Oscillation and Feedback". If, at Point A, the trend below standard is recognized and new inputs are added, but not until Point B, the system will overreact and go beyond the allowable limits. Again, if this is recognized at Point C, but inputs are not withdrawn until Point D, it will cause the system to drop below the lower limit of allowable variation.

One solution to this problem rests in anticipation, which involves measuring not only the change but also the rate of change. The correction is outlined as a factor of the type and rate of the error. The difficulty also might be overcome by reducing the time lag between the measurement of the output and the adjustment to input. If a trend can be indicated, a time lead can be introduced to compensate for the time lag, bringing about consistency between the need for correction and the type and magnitude of the indicated action. It is usually more effective for an organization to maintain continuous measurement of its performance and to make small adjustments in operations constantly (this assumes a highly sensitive control system). Information feedback, consequently, should be timely and correct to be effective. That is, the information should provide an accurate indication of the status of the system.

Contemporary challenges to management control systems are systematized by Lambovska and Angelova-Stanimirova in a 2025 study.

== Setting standards ==
Setting the proper standards or control limits is a problem in many systems. Parents are confronted with this dilemma in expressing what they expect of their children, and business managers face the same issue in establishing standards that will be acceptable to employees. Some theorists have proposed that workers be allowed to set their own standards, on the assumption that when people establish their own goals, they are more apt to accept and achieve them.

Standards should be as precise as possible and communicated to all persons concerned. Moreover, communication alone is not sufficient; understanding is necessary. In human systems, standards tend to be poorly defined and the allowable range of deviation from standard also indefinite. For example, how many hours each day should a professor be expected to be available for student consultation? Or, what kind of behavior should be expected by students in the classroom? Discretion and personal judgment play a large part in such systems, to determine whether corrective action should be taken.

Perhaps the most difficult problem in human systems is the unresponsiveness of individuals to indicated correction. This may take the form of opposition and subversion to control, or it may be related to the lack of defined responsibility or authority to take action. Leadership and positive motivation then become vital ingredients in achieving the proper response to input requirements.

Most control problems relate to design; thus the solution to these problems must start at that point. Automatic control systems, provided that human intervention is possible to handle exceptions, offer the greatest promise. There is a danger, however, that we may measure characteristics that do not represent effective performance (as in the case of the speaker who requested that all of the people who could not hear what he was saying should raise their hands), or that improper information may be communicated.

=== Importance of control ===
1. Motivation for efficient employees
2. For complete discipline
3. Helpful in future planning
4. Aids efficiency
5. Decrease in risk
6. Helpful in coordination

== Limitations ==
1. Difficult to set up quantitative standards: Controlling loses its benefits when standards and norms cannot be explained in volume statistics. Human behaviour, job satisfaction, and employee morale are some of the factors that are not well managed by quantitative measurement. The control loses some of its usefulness when it is not possible to define a situation in terms of numbers. This makes measuring performance and comparing it to benchmarks a difficult task. It is not an easy task to set principles for human work and set standards for competence and how to maintain one's level of satisfaction. In such cases, it depends on the decision of the manager. This is especially true of job satisfaction, employee behaviour and morale. For example, the task of measuring the quality of behaviour of employees is qualitative. It cannot be measured directly. To measure the behaviour of employees, absenteeism, conflict frequency, turnover etc. can be taken into account. If all these measures have a high proportion, it can be said that the behaviour of the employees in the institution is not great. It is clear that it is not possible to set criteria for all projects and suitable models are not completely accurate.

2. Less control on external controls: Any project operating in another state of the country under a government system cannot stop development. In addition, no company can manage the availability of technology, the latest acquisition of information technology and high competition in the market, etc. There are some issues that are not under the control of management or the organization. As such, the company cannot control external factors such as government policy, technological change, competition and anything that is not under the control of the company and makes things unmanageable. Policies need to be put in place through planning to ensure staff re-energizes improvements. It is incorrect to say that the manager by completing the management process may warn the organization. The manager can control internal factors (e.g. human power, infrastructure, etc.) but cannot control external factors (e.g. political, social change, competition, etc.)

3. Restrictions by employees: When a manager is used to managing his or her subordinates, some of his or her colleagues may refuse and report as directed by the manager or company. This usually happens because you are in control of the rules with or without discussion. For example, users in this field may resist when the GPS or control area of a control system is tracking their location. They see it as a restriction on their freedom. Employees are restricted or restricted in their freedom. Opponents of coping with this challenge are not under the control of the company in some respects. For example, workers may complain while kept under surveillance with the help of CCTV. Employees can resist using the camera for monitoring them. An employer may force employees but they cannot force them to work based on rules and regulations. The business environment is constantly changing. A new regulatory framework must be used to reverse this change. However, users are opposed to these systems. For example, if large company employees have CCTV (Close Circuit TV) to control their work, they will challenge this process.

4. Expensive to install: Establishing an effective control system requires significant time, financial resources, and managerial effort. Organizations must invest in skilled personnel, multiple management levels, and appropriate monitoring and reporting systems. These costs can be difficult for small organizations to bear, making comprehensive control systems more feasible for larger enterprises.

5. Overcontrolling can lead to employee turnover: However, legal aid covers a number of effective procedures if an employee has complaints; if the employee becomes upset by overcontrolling he might get irritated and moves to another company. In the current situation, managers often keep their employees under control several times to monitor their behaviour on the ground. This can be a hands-on example, especially in the case of new members and facilitates a variety of organizational changes. With too much control, employees feel their freedom is being violated. They do not want to work for an organization who do not let them work according to their preferences. That is why they go to other companies that do give them freedom. It takes much time and effort to manage the system.

== See also ==
- Business valuation
- Command hierarchy
- Control freak
- Control premium
- Management
- Management control system
- Management cybernetics
- Mergers and acquisitions
- Performance paradox
- Power (social and political)
- Viable system model
