= American Institutes for Research =

Nonprofit social science organization

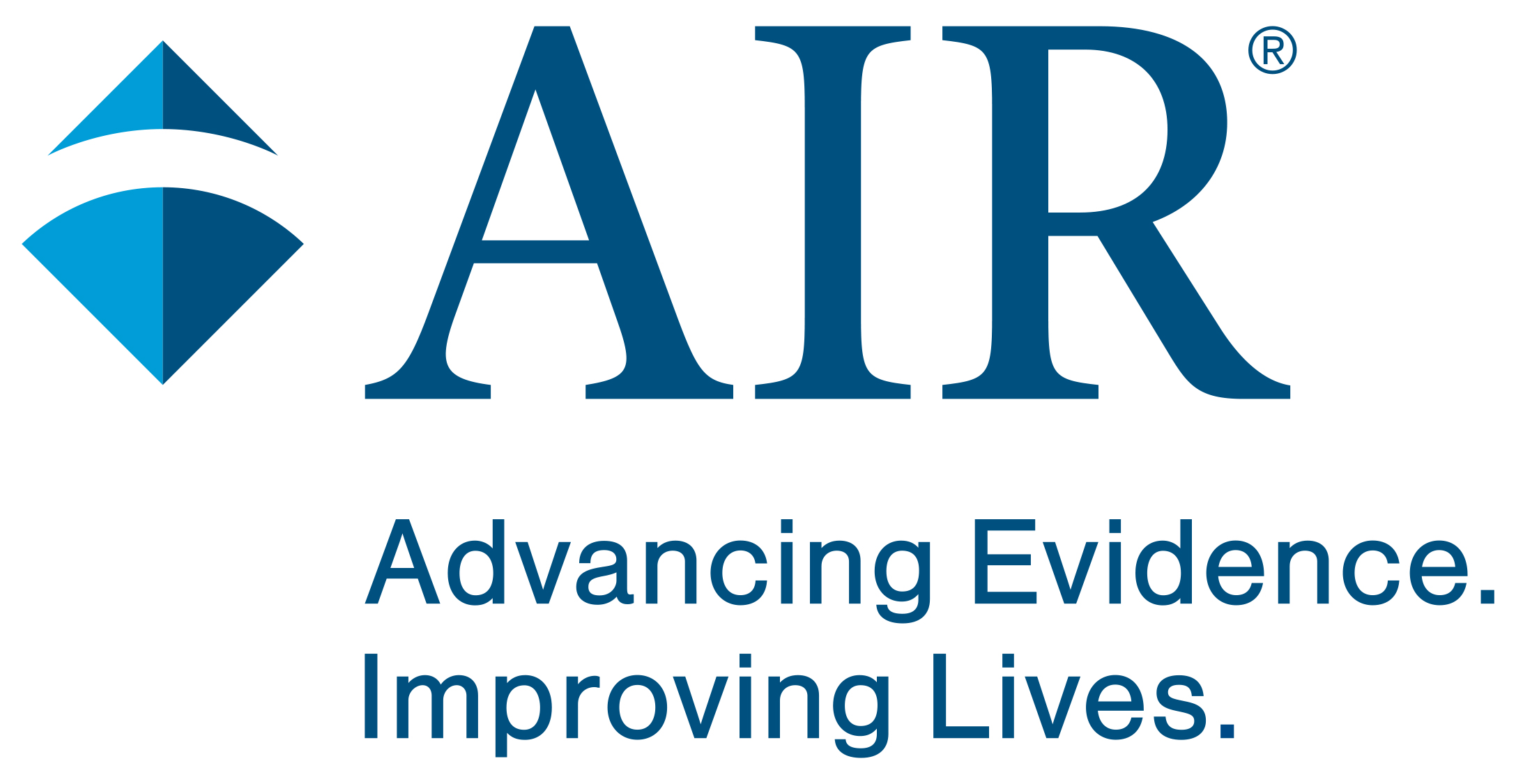
- Founded: 1946; 80 years ago
- Founder: John C. Flanagan
- Type: Nonprofit research, evaluation, and technical assistance organization
- Purpose: To conduct and apply the behavioral and social science research, evaluation, artificial intelligence, data science, and technical assistance in education, health, human services, international development, and the workforce.
- Location: Arlington County, Virginia, U.S.
- Origins: Critical incident technique, Project Talent
- Region served: United States and international
- Key people: Jessica Heppen, President and CEO; Lawrence Bobo, Board Chair

The American Institutes for Research (AIR) is a nonprofit, nonpartisan behavioral and social science research, evaluation, and technical assistance organization based in Arlington, Virginia. One of the world's largest social science research organizations, AIR has locations across the United States and abroad.

In 2010 and 2011, The Washington Post selected AIR as one of the top ten nonprofit firms in the Washington metropolitan area.

== History ==
AIR's founder, John C. Flanagan, a pioneer in aviation psychology, is known for developing the critical incident technique, an innovative method for screening and selecting personnel. While working for the U.S. Army Air Forces during World War II, Flanagan developed CIT as an aptitude test to identify potential combat pilots. Later, the technique was adapted for other industries, and CIT is still a model for numerous organizations and researchers.

Flanagan established American Institutes for Research in 1946. He focused on workforce education research and launched Project Talent, a longitudinal study following 400,000 high school students across the U.S., which has continued for the past 50 years and provided data for hundreds of researchers and publications.

Charles Murray, the controversial political scientist, worked at AIR, but left after determining his work was not making a difference.

At the end of 2019, AIR sold its student assessment division to Cambium Learning Group, Inc.

In 2020, AIR acquired IMPAQ, LLC (including subsidiary Maher & Maher), and Kimetrica.

== Mission statement ==
The American Institutes for Research® (AIR) generates evidence and applies data-driven solutions that expand opportunities and improve lives for all.

== Areas of work ==
AIR conducts behavioral and social science research and delivers technical assistance, both domestically and internationally, in the areas of health, education, and workforce productivity. Specific areas include early childhood; P-K-12 education, including teacher, school, and district leadership; juvenile justice; mental health and well-being; higher education and career readiness; adult learning and workforce issues; chronic and infectious diseases; patient and family engagement; trauma informed care; healthcare knowledge translation; refugee and migrant populations; and social and emotional learning.

Work Flanagan and AIR are known for includes Project Talent, the largest and most comprehensive study of high school students ever conducted in the United States. Data from Project Talent is now being used to conduct research on aging and dementia; core evaluations for U.S. Department of Education programs; technical expertise on implementing the Every Student Succeeds Act (ESSA) and how federal funds are used; Project A, the largest personnel survey in the history of the U.S. Army; and fully or partially-funded federal projects, including Regional Education Labs (RELs) and Comprehensive Centers, the National Center for Family Homelessness, the Center for Analysis of Longitudinal Data in Education Research (CALDER), the College and Career Readiness and Success Center, and the Center for English Language Learners.

== Leadership ==
Jessica Heppen is AIR's seventh President and CEO and the first woman to serve in the role in the organization's history. She succeeded David Myers, who retired on February 1, 2024.

The twelve-member board of directors is led by Lawrence D. Bobo, a professor of social sciences at Harvard University. He succeeded Patricia B. Gurin, professor emerita of social psychology and women's studies at University of Michigan.
