= Project Talent =

High School study

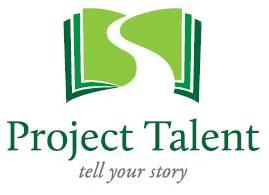
Project Talent Logo, revised 2010

Project Talent is a national longitudinal study that first surveyed over 440,000 American high school students in 1960. At the time, it was the largest and most comprehensive study of high school students ever conducted in the United States. Designed by American Institutes for Research founder John C. Flanagan, Project Talent was intended as “the first scientifically planned national inventory of human talents.” Students from 1,353 schools across the country participated in two full to four days of testing. Fifty years later, the data is still widely used in multiple fields of study and follow-up studies are underway with original participants.

== Origins and Historical Context ==
The study was developed by American Institutes for Research, a nonprofit, nonpartisan research institute, and several other organizations, including the University of Pittsburgh, through a Cooperative Agreement. It was funded by the United States Office of Education. It began as a national survey of the aptitudes and abilities of American youth. High school students in 1,350 schools across the country were administered an extensive and rigorous series of questionnaires that assessed cognitive skills, collected demographic information, and surveyed their personal experiences, extracurricular interests, and goals for the future.

At 1, 5, and 11 years after projected high school graduation, participants were asked to complete additional mail questionnaires that focused on their work and personal life. In 2009, the American Institutes for Research began preparations for additional follow-up studies.

Over the past 50 years, researchers have utilized Project Talent data for studies in economics, sociology, psychology, psychometrics, history, health, education, and many other fields. Project Talent's combination of aptitude, cognitive, social, psychological, and health measures make it a unique data source for lifecourse studies. The study is also of particular interest as a profile of a generation that came of age at a time of unprecedented cultural, social, and technological change.

In an interview with Time magazine in 1962, Dr. Flanagan explained his conviction that many Americans were entering professions for which they were unsuited. He described Project Talent as a mechanism for identifying individuals’ strengths and steering them on to paths where those strengths would be utilized. He based his work on his experiences during World War II, when he headed a United States Army Air Corps aviation psychology program that sought to identify those who would excel at training and become able combat pilots. Rather than making military assignments based solely on educational attainment or general IQ, he designed and administered exams to match raw abilities to particular skill sets.

Regarding Project Talent, Vice President Lyndon B. Johnson wrote to Dr. Flanagan that “it would be difficult to think of a more worthwhile undertaking than your efforts to assure that the best use is made of our nation’s most valuable resource.”

== Study Design ==
Over 1,350 public, private, and parochial schools were chosen to participate in Project Talent based on their geographic location, school size, and student retention rate. With the exception of New York City and Chicago schools, where a random sample of approximately 1 in 10 students participated, every student in grades 9–12 in a participating school took the Project Talent tests. Ultimately, Project Talent included roughly 5 percent of all the high school students in the U.S. in 1960. The Project Talent sample design and related matters were studied from a modern viewpoint in 2014.

=== The base-year tests ===
Project Talent included standard aptitude tests (e.g., vocabulary and arithmetic) and subject tests (e.g., English and the sciences). It also measured students’ personality attributes (e.g., sociability and calmness) and innate capabilities (e.g., memory skills, creativity, and spatial and abstract reasoning). Students provided detailed information regarding their health status, family background, extracurricular activities, and plans for the future. The results offered a glimpse look into the experiences and aspirations of American adolescents in 1960.

=== The Follow-ups ===
Mail surveys were administered to each of the grade cohorts in the 1960 sample at 1, 5, and 11 years after their expected high school graduation. While each of the follow-up surveys differed slightly, they all collected information on participants’ postsecondary education, labor force participation and plans, family formation, military service, health behaviors, and life satisfaction. After the mid-1970s, name and address changes hindered participant tracking efforts and the project fell into a 30-year hiatus.

== Select Findings ==
Project Talent data from the base-year and follow-up studies highlight the dramatic and long-term effects of individual personality, family background, and early life experiences.

Across the country, students’ performance on the aptitude tests demonstrated the necessity of more individualized instruction in the classroom and more personalized career and college guidance. For example, children with superior spatial skills were well-suited to careers in science but were often not encouraged to enter the field unless they also performed well in more traditional math and science courses.

Regardless of academic ability, parental involvement and socioeconomic status were the strongest predictors of students’ educational attainment.

Project Talent documented the transformation in attitudes toward marriage and the role of women in the 1960s and ‘70s.

It also informed some of the earliest findings on gender-based wage inequalities and post-traumatic stress disorder among veterans from the Vietnam War.

More recently, Project Talent data has been used to study long-term changes in the American education system, work force, and family structure. Data from the study has been used in more than 400 analyses and publications across a variety of disciplines.

Upon completion of current and future follow-up activities, the Project Talent dataset will both complement and extend current research endeavors on aging and the life course and will be comparable with aging datasets such as Health and Retirement Survey (HRS) (1992 – present) and the Wisconsin Longitudinal Study (1957 – present). Project Talent can be also compared with similar data sets, such as the National Education Longitudinal Study of 2002 and the National Survey of Young Women and Mature Women.

== Current Activities ==
The Project Talent Twin and Sibling Study: In 2014 a follow-up survey began with the some 5,000 twins and their siblings that participated in the original study. Nearly 95% of these participants were located, despite not having been in contact with them for nearly 50 years. There are several other large twin studies in the U.S., but Project Talent is the only one that began with a representative sample. It includes males and females from a wide range of ethnic and racial backgrounds from across the U.S. It is the only twin study that includes siblings of twins and other siblings from the same communities. 65% responded to the new survey and the data is currently being analyzed.

Large-Scale Followup Study: Beginning in 2009, the American Institutes for Research, with support from the National Institute on Aging, began preparations for a large-scale follow-up study. The American Institutes for Research launched a major effort to relocate participants and reconstruct the data from earlier waves into more modern file formats.

In 2011, AIR partnered with the University of Michigan to conduct a pilot follow-up study. Slightly fewer than 4,000 participants—approximately 1 percent of the original sample—received a survey regarding their career, family, and health. The study's high response rates confirmed the feasibility of locating and surveying participants after an extended hiatus. Analysis of the pilot study is still underway and findings are forthcoming.

Additional follow-up studies currently under development seek to examine how the behaviors, abilities, and interests demonstrated early in life impact the well-being of individuals as they age.
