= Assessment centre =

Candidate evaluation site

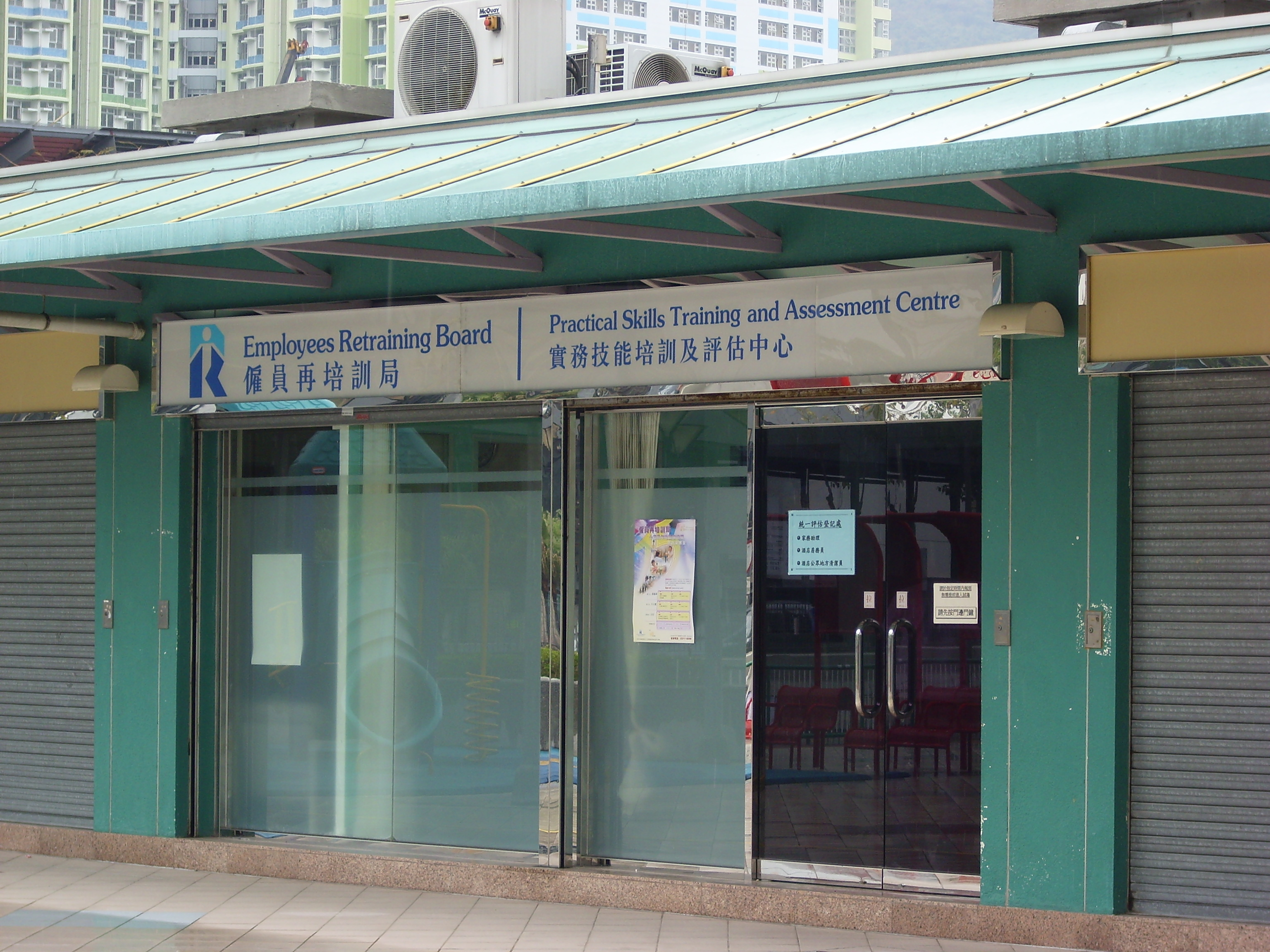
An example of an assessment centre

An assessment center is a process where candidates are examined to determine their suitability for specific types of employment, especially management or military command. The candidates' personality and aptitudes are determined by techniques including interviews, group exercises, presentations, examinations and psychometric testing.

== History ==
Assessment centres were created in World War II to select officers and are still commonly used in military recruitment today. Examples include the Admiralty Interview Board of the Royal Navy and the War Office Selection Board of the British Army. After World War II, the OSS-type assessment centre was essentially abandoned in the United States, except for some internal use in intelligence-gathering operations by the CIA. The British Civil Service Selection Board and Australians still used it for selection in their military colleges. Also, South Africans used the technique to identify supervisors in gold mines.

Assessment centres specifically applied for industrial usage can be traced back to the early 1950s and the pioneering work of Robert K Greenleaf and Douglas W. Bray of the American Telephone & Telegraph Company (AT&T). Douglas W. Bray as a director of human resources at AT&T, directed a study that lasted over 20 years and followed the careers of young business managers as they progressed up the telephone company rankings. This study showed that the assessment centre method could successfully predict organizational achievement and was later implemented throughout AT&T and later on adopted by many other companies: IBM, Standard Oil (Ohio) and Sears for example.

In 1975, the first guidelines on the use of assessment centres were created as a statement of the considerations believed to be most important for all users of the assessment centre method. The guidelines ensure the integrity of the process, the validity of the data, the qualifications of assessors, and the rights of the participants. The guidelines have since been revised several times to reflect current legal issues, global insights, and technological advances in the field. The most current version of the Guidelines and Ethical Considerations for Assessment Center Operations was endorsed by the 38th International Congress on Assessment Methods in Alexandria in October 2014.

Today, The ACM is used by organizations all over the world in both private and public sectors to better select of employees and identifying their development in different areas.

AT&T created a building for recruitment of staff in the 1950s. This was called The Assessment Centre and was influential on subsequent personnel methods in other businesses.

Other companies use this method to recruit for their graduate programmes by assessing the personality and intellect of potential employees who have recently graduated from university and have nil or limited work history. The big four accountancy firms conduct assessment centre days to recruit their trainees. Data from 2020 found that 34% of employers use assessment centers when recruiting managers, professionals, and graduates. In recent years companies have been set up to support assessment centre coaching.

== Purpose ==
An assessment centre contains a process for evaluating behaviour based on multiple evaluations, including job-related simulations, interviews, and psychological tests.

The ultimate reason for having an assessment centre in any organization is to gather all relevant information, under standardized conditions, about an individual's capabilities to perform a given task. Assessment centres are often the method of choice for selecting senior leaders in government and municipal jobs, including police chiefs and fire captains.

During the process of assessing candidates, a series of exercises designed to simulate the conditions of a given job are assigned to the candidates. This helps the assessor determine whether the candidate possesses the necessary skills and behaviour required for the job.

The assessment centre method attempts to provide a wide-ranging, multidimensional assessment, and has a record of both research significance and practical effectiveness. The purpose of assessment centre is to examine the skills and psychological state of an individual in order to determine his or her expected performance in a position.
