= Training needs analysis =

Training Analysis (sometimes called Training Needs Analysis (TNA)) is the process of identifying the gap in employee training and related training needs.

== Introduction ==
Training Need Analysis (TNA) is the process of identifying the gap between employee training and needs of training. Training needs analysis is the first stage in the training process and involves a series of steps that reveal whether training will help to solve the problem which has been identified. Training can be described as “the acquisition of skills, concepts or attitudes that result in improved performance within the job environment”. Training needs analysis looks at each side of the operational area of a job so that the concepts and attitudes of the human elements of a system can be effectively identified and appropriate training can be specified.

Training needs analysis is most often used as part of the system development process. Due to the close tie between the design of the system and the training required, in most cases it runs alongside the development to capture the training requirements.

== Design Integrated Training Analysis ==
Tools and methods for an integrated approach, Design Integrated Training Analysis, have been proposed and developed. The trade-offs between design and training are both assessed in light of the understanding of the operational tasks. This approach also uses information on recorded critical incidents to review proposed training and to provide traceability between hazards and training. This single, integrated approach to human factors and training needs analysis has been successfully used on a number of defence projects.

== Training Analysis Process ==
Over the last 20 years the critical nature of the man-in-the-loop has changed from simply manual dexterity and procedural operation to a state in which their decision making, cognitive abilities, data assimilation, communication skills, and attitude are all crucial. In addition the job structure of the personnel operationally involved with modern systems has diversified in direct proportion to the complexity of the technology. This has fueled the need for a formal approach.

The task of training can be broken down into a number of discrete components, each addressing a different part of the overall learning process. This breakdown is as follows:-

- Psycho-motor Skills
- Procedural Skills
- Knowledge Transfer
- Communication Skills
- Colossal Thinking
- Attitude Learning
- Performance Training
- Physiological Stresses

The role of training analysis is to build a formal bridge between the available design data and the training media and training objectives, in order to facilitate the transfer of training elements into the operational environment.

For complex multi-user system a user-to-task map is often constructed to present the relationship between the tasks and the identified team structure and also to identify new groups of users that would need to have an understanding of the system. The training gap is assessed by a comparison between the goals and tasks undertaken by the individuals and the existing training.

There is a wide variety of training media that can be used, ranging from traditional lecture-based teaching to sophisticated simulators. Different media will be more or less appropriate for different activities. It is necessary to determine the most suitable and cost-effective training media for the different areas.

There have been many different approaches defined, however, the system approach to training has been the most successful.

Training Needs Analysis (TNA) is defined as the “Identification of training requirements and the most cost effective means of meeting those requirements”.

A TNA should always be performed where a major new development in policy, equipment acquisition or procedures is deemed to have potential impact upon the current training regime.

TST has considerable experience of successfully employing the accepted techniques applied to the development of training systems, including the Systems Approach to Training (SAT) in both the defence and civilian domains using customer specific standards such as JSP 822 where required.

Carrying out all TNA activates in accordance with SAT principles ensures rigorous visibility in each design stage with clear audit trails from the initial Scoping Study through to the recommended solution.

== Benefits ==
- Speed up the transition of adopting change
- Reduce the risk and impact on the business and ensure that your people are not only prepared for the change but fully equipped
- Help the trainee to achieve their goals and dreams in life.
- Boost up the speed of business

== See also ==
- Training
- System design
- Human factors
- People Capability Maturity Model
