= Transfer of training =

Transfer of training is applying knowledge and skills acquired during training to a targeted job or role. This is a term commonly used within industrial and organizational psychology.

For example, after completing a safety course, transfer of training occurs when the employee uses learned safety behaviors in their work environment.

Theoretically, transfer of training is a specific application of the theory of transfer of learning that describes the positive, zero, or negative performance outcomes of a training program. The positive transfer of training-- the increase in job performance attributed to training-- has become the goal of many organizations. Characteristics of trainees, the work environment, and training strategies contribute to this goal of positive transfer. Ultimately, transfer of training provides organizations with a method to evaluate training's effectiveness and identify areas for training's improvement.

== Types ==
There are three types of transfer of training:

1. Positive transfer: Training increases performance in the targeted job or role. Positive transfer is the goal of most training programs.
2. Negative transfer: Training decreases performance in the targeted job or role.
3. Zero transfer: Training neither increases nor decreases performance in the targeted job or role.

== Model of transfer ==
Baldwin and Ford (1988) is the most commonly cited model of transfer, which defines the transfer of training as the generalization and maintenance of material learned in training to the work environment.

Within this model, the authors conceptualize transfer of training as a three-stage process. In the first stage, the inputs to training, including the training strategies, the work environment, and trainee characteristics are defined. Next, through the training process, these inputs generate training outputs in the form of learning and retention. Ultimately, transfer of training occurs in the final stage when learning and retention are generalized and maintained in the work environment. Using the training inputs defined in this model, psychological research has identified many factors that contribute to the positive transfer of training.

== Influences on positive transfer ==
Within the current literature, there is a lack of consensus over what factors contribute to the positive transfer of training. However, across psychological research, the following factors have consistently impacted positive transfer.

=== Trainee characteristics ===
1. Cognitive Ability: Higher cognitive ability typically leads to higher levels of retention and generalization of learned material.
2. Self-efficacy: Higher self-efficacy contributes to positive transfer through its influence on confidence and persistence.
3. Motivation: Individuals with a higher motivation to learn tend to experience higher levels of positive transfer of training.
4. Personality: Higher measures of conscientiousness increase the likelihood of positive transfer.
5. Perceptions of Utility: Beliefs in the value and usefulness of training increase the likelihood of positive transfer.

=== Work environment ===
1. Transfer climate: By definition, a positive transfer climate is a work environment that contains cues and feedback mechanisms that remind employees of learned material. Positive transfer climates tend to facilitate higher levels of positive transfer.
2. Support: Support from supervisors and peers leads to higher levels of positive transfer.
3. Opportunity to Perform: Work environments that provide opportunities to use learned material promote higher positive transfer of training.
4. Check-Ins: Regular reviews of training material solidify knowledge and contribute to positive transfer.

=== Training strategies ===
1. Similarity: Also referred to as identical elements theory, a high degree of similarity between the training environment and work environment increases the positive transfer of training.
2. Active Learning: Hands-on practice of material contributes to positive transfer, especially when it incorporates a variety of different contexts.
3. Behavioral Modeling: A training technique inspired by Albert Bandura's theory of social learning, which involves explanations, demonstrations, and active learning, feedback, and reinforcement . Behavioral modeling is associated with increased positive transfer, especially when both incorrect and correct behavioral examples are provided during training.
4. Error-based examples: Training that focuses on how to deal with problems and learn from errors facilitates higher positive transfer.
5. Collaboration: Collaboration between trainees, trainers, and supervisors during training increases positive transfer.
6. Multiple Strategies: The use of variety of teaching and learning strategies facilitates positive transfer.
7. Goals: Setting goals and expectations for training increases positive transfer.
8. Assessments: Intermittent assessments of participant's knowledge of learned material increases positive transfer.

== Assessment ==
Positive transfer is the goal of many organizational training programs. Therefore, transfer of training plays a vital role in evaluating a training program's effectiveness. Common training evaluation methods, such as Kirkpatrick's Taxonomy and the Augmented Framework of Alliger et al., utilize transfer as an essential criterion to evaluate training. Due to its behavioral outcomes, transfer of training allows organizations to quantify the impact of training and measure differences in performance.

A 2010 meta-analysis by Blume and colleagues found that relationships between predictors and training transfer were inflated when both were measured using the same source and in the same context.
