= John C. Flanagan =

- Born: January 7, 1906; Armour, South Dakota, United States
- Died: April 15, 1996 (aged 90); Menlo Park, California, United States

John Clemans Flanagan (January 7, 1906 – April 15, 1996) was a noted psychologist most known for developing the critical incident technique, which identifies and classifies behaviors associated with the success or failure of human activity. He was a pioneer of aviation psychology. During World War II Flanagan was commissioned by the U.S. Army Air Forces in 1941 to head an aviation psychology program that developed tests to help identify pilots suitable for combat missions.

Flanagan was born in Armour, South Dakota on January 7, 1906, and raised in Seattle, Washington. He died on April 15, 1996, at his home in Menlo Park, California. He graduated from the University of Washington in 1929, and was the starting quarterback on the football team his senior year. He received his doctorate from Harvard University in 1934.

In 1946, Flanagan founded the American Institutes for Research, a not-for-profit behavioral and social research organization that applied the critical incident technique to education and other fields.

In 1960 Flanagan initiated Project Talent, a massive survey of more than 400,000 high school students throughout the United States. To follow up on the needs revealed by Project Talent, Flanagan developed Project PLAN — Program for Learning in Accordance with Needs — an entire curriculum from grades one through twelve designed to meet the individual needs of all students. This was one of the earliest and most comprehensive individualized computer-assisted learning programs.

Among the honors Flanagan received were: Legion of Merit by the Army Air Corps; Raymond F. Longacre Award of the Aero-Medical Association, Edward Lee Thorndike Award of the APA Division of Educational Psychology, 1976 Distinguished Professional Contribution Award of APA, Phi Delta Kappa Award for Outstanding Contributions to Education, Development and Research, ETS Award for Distinguished Service to Measurement; Professional Practice Award of APA's Division of Industrial/Organizational Psychology.
