= Critical incident technique =

Procedures for observing human behavior

The critical incident technique (or CIT) is a set of procedures used for collecting direct observations of human behavior that have critical significance and meet methodically defined criteria. These observations are then kept track of as incidents, which are then used to solve practical problems and develop broad psychological principles. A critical incident can be described as one that makes a contribution—either positively or negatively—to an activity or phenomenon. Critical incidents can be gathered in various ways, but typically respondents are asked to tell a story about an experience they have had.

CIT is a flexible method that usually relies on five major areas. The first is determining and reviewing the incident, then fact-finding, which involves collecting the details of the incident from the participants. When all of the facts are collected, the next step is to identify the issues. Afterwards a decision can be made on how to resolve the issues based on various possible solutions. The final and most important aspect is the evaluation, which will determine if the solution that was selected will solve the root cause of the situation and will cause no further problems.

== History ==
The studies of Sir Francis Galton are said to have laid the foundation for the critical incident technique, but it is the work of Colonel John C. Flanagan, that resulted in the present form of CIT. Flanagan defined the critical incident technique as:

[A] set of procedures for collecting direct observations of human behaviour in such a way as to facilitate their potential usefulness in solving practical problems and developing broad psychological principles ... By an incident is meant any specifiable human activity that is sufficiently complete in itself to permit inferences and predictions to be made about the person performing the act. To be critical the incident must occur in a situation where the purpose or intent of the act seems fairly clear to the observer and where its consequences are sufficiently definite to leave little doubt concerning its effects.

Flanagan's work was carried out as part of the Aviation Psychology Program of the United States Army Air Forces during World War II, where Flanagan conducted a series of studies focused on differentiating effective and ineffective work behaviors. Flanagan went on to found American Institutes for Research continuing to use the critical incident technique in a variety of research. Since then CIT has spread as a method to identify job requirements, develop recommendations for effective practices, and determine competencies for a vast number of professionals in various disciplines. In particular, it has been used in service research.

== Principal uses ==
CIT can be used in training, systems design and accident investigation. It is an integral part of large scale task analysis. It identifies the most costly happenings in a complex environment where people and machines work as a system. Its origin in investigating pilot errors in wartime,^{328 et seq} and other life-and-death situations, means it identifies top priorities in a man-machine system or other complex action-oriented situation. These priorities then feed into procedures for selection and training, and also (continuing the pilot example) into cockpit instrument design.

In healthcare, CIT is used in situations where direct examination of clinical staff and researchers can help them better understand their roles and help them solve practical problems. CIT allows clinical staff to better understand their roles in the clinical setting. Another advantage is that it helps them gain better knowledge about their interactions with patients and other clinicians. It also helps clinical staff better understand their practice from a variety of roles (e.g., physician, nurse, clinical educator, nurse informatician, faculty member). In healthcare research, CIT can be a good resource in identifying the experiences of a patient in the healthcare setting, exploring the dimensions of patient–provider interactions and determining patient responses to illnesses and treatments.

CIT is also widely used in organizational development as a research technique for identification of organizational problems and is suitable for knowledge management in project-based organizations. CIT is used as an interview technique, where the informants are encouraged to talk about unusual organizational incidents instead of answering direct questions. Using CIT deemphasizes the inclusion of general opinions about management and working procedures, instead focusing on specific incidents.

In market research, CIT has been used more frequently in the last ten years. Although the CIT method first appeared in the marketing literature thirty years ago, the major catalyst for use of the CIT method in service research appears to have been a Journal of Marketing study conducted by Bitner, Booms, and Tetreault (1990) that investigated sources of satisfaction and dissatisfaction in service encounters. Since the Bitner et al. article, nearly 200 CIT studies have appeared in marketing-related literature.

CIT has also been used in studies of information-seeking behavior.

The employment of CIT may also allow construction of typical scenarios of user behavior when they interact with various technologies including information systems. For this, researchers should solicit:

1. the cause, description and outcome of a critical incident;
2. users' feelings and perceptions of the situation;
3. actions taken during the incident;
4. changes (if any) in their future behavior.

The typical scenarios may be presented visually as a diagram or a causal model.

== Advantages and disadvantages ==
By identifying possible problems associated with major user–system or product complications, CIT recommendations try to ensure that the same type of situations do not result in a similar loss. There are both advantages and disadvantages to using this method, as shown below. Overall, however, CIT has been demonstrated to be a sound method since first presented in 1954. Relatively few modifications have been suggested to the method in the more than 50 years since it was introduced, and only minor changes have been made to Flanagan's original approach, indicating reasonable robustness.

=== Advantages ===
- Flexible method that can be used to improve multi-user systems.
- Data is collected from the respondent's perspective and in his or her own words.
- Does not force the respondents into any given framework.
- Identifies even rare events that might be missed by other methods which only focus on common and everyday events.
- Useful when problems occur but the cause and severity are not known.
- Inexpensive and provides rich information.
- Emphasizes the features that will make a system particularly vulnerable and can bring major benefits (e.g. safety).
- Can be applied using questionnaires or interviews.
- Easy to understand.

=== Disadvantages ===
- A first problem comes from the type of the reported incidents. The critical incident technique will rely on events being remembered by users and will also require the accurate and truthful reporting of them. Since critical incidents often rely on memory, incidents may be imprecise or may even go unreported.
- The method has a built-in bias towards incidents that happened recently, since these are easier to recall.
- Respondents may not be accustomed to or willing to take the time to tell (or write) a complete story when describing a critical incident.
- Since this method is based on incidents it does not say anything about the everyday situation so it is not very representative.

== Bibliography ==
Examples in informatics / case studies

- Stach, A. and Serenko, A. (2010). "The impact of expectation disconfirmation on customer loyalty and recommendation behavior: Investigating online travel and tourism services". Journal of Information Technology Management XX(3): 26–41.
- Providing Critical Incident Stress Debriefing (CISD) to Individuals & Communities in Situational Crisis, Joseph A. Davis, PhD, LLD(hon), B.C.E.T.S., F.A.A.E.T.S. 1998 by The American Academy of Experts in Traumatic Stress, Inc.
- Use of the critical incident technique in primary care in the audit of deaths by suicide, Redpath, A Stacey, E Pugh and E Holmes County Durham Health Authority, UK.
- Audit of deaths in general practice: pilot study of the critical incident technique, Berlin A, Spencer JA, Bhopal RS, van Zwanenberg TD. Medical School, University of Newcastle upon Tyne.
- Effect of cross-functional integration between operations and marketing on negative critical incidents, Bardhan AK, Pattnaik S. Total Quality Management & Business Excellence, Volume 28, 2017 - Issue 11-12.
- Serenko, A. (2019). "Knowledge sabotage as an extreme form of counterproductive knowledge behavior: Conceptualization, typology and empirical demonstration". Journal of Knowledge Management 23(7): 1260-1288.
