= Industrial and production engineering =

Branch of engineering

Industrial and production engineering (IPE) is an interdisciplinary engineering discipline that includes manufacturing technology, engineering sciences, management science, and optimization of complex processes, systems, or organizations. It is concerned with the understanding and application of engineering procedures in manufacturing processes and production methods. Industrial engineering dates back all the way to the industrial revolution, initiated in 1700s by Sir Adam Smith, Henry Ford, Eli Whitney, Frank Gilbreth and Lilian Gilbreth, Henry Gantt, F.W. Taylor, etc. After the 1970s, industrial and production engineering developed worldwide and started to widely use automation and robotics. Industrial and production engineering includes three areas: Mechanical engineering (where the production engineering comes from), industrial engineering, and management science.

The objective is to improve efficiency, drive up effectiveness of manufacturing, quality control, and to reduce cost while making their products more attractive and marketable. Industrial engineering is concerned with the development, improvement, and implementation of integrated systems of people, money, knowledge, information, equipment, energy, materials, as well as analysis and synthesis. The principles of IPE include mathematical, physical and social sciences and methods of engineering design to specify, predict, and evaluate the results to be obtained from the systems or processes currently in place or being developed. The target of production engineering is to complete the production process in the smoothest, most-judicious and most-economic way. Production engineering also overlaps substantially with manufacturing engineering and industrial engineering. The concept of production engineering is interchangeable with manufacturing engineering.

As for education, undergraduates normally start off by taking courses such as physics, mathematics (calculus, linear analysis, differential equations), computer science, and chemistry. Undergraduates will take more major specific courses like production and inventory scheduling, process management, CAD/CAM manufacturing, ergonomics, etc., towards the later years of their undergraduate careers. In some parts of the world, universities will offer Bachelor's in Industrial and Production Engineering. However, most universities in the U.S. will offer them separately. Various career paths that may follow for industrial and production engineers include: Plant Engineers, Manufacturing Engineers, Quality Engineers, Process Engineers and industrial managers, project management, manufacturing, production and distribution, From the various career paths people can take as an industrial and production engineer, most average a starting salary of at least $50,000.

== History ==
=== Industrial Revolution ===
The roots of the industrial engineering profession date back to the Industrial Revolution. The technologies that helped mechanize traditional manual operations in the textile industry including the Flying shuttle, the Spinning jenny, and perhaps most importantly the Steam engine generated Economies of scale that made Mass production in centralized locations attractive for the first time. The concept of the production system had its genesis in the factories created by these innovations.

=== Specialization of labor ===
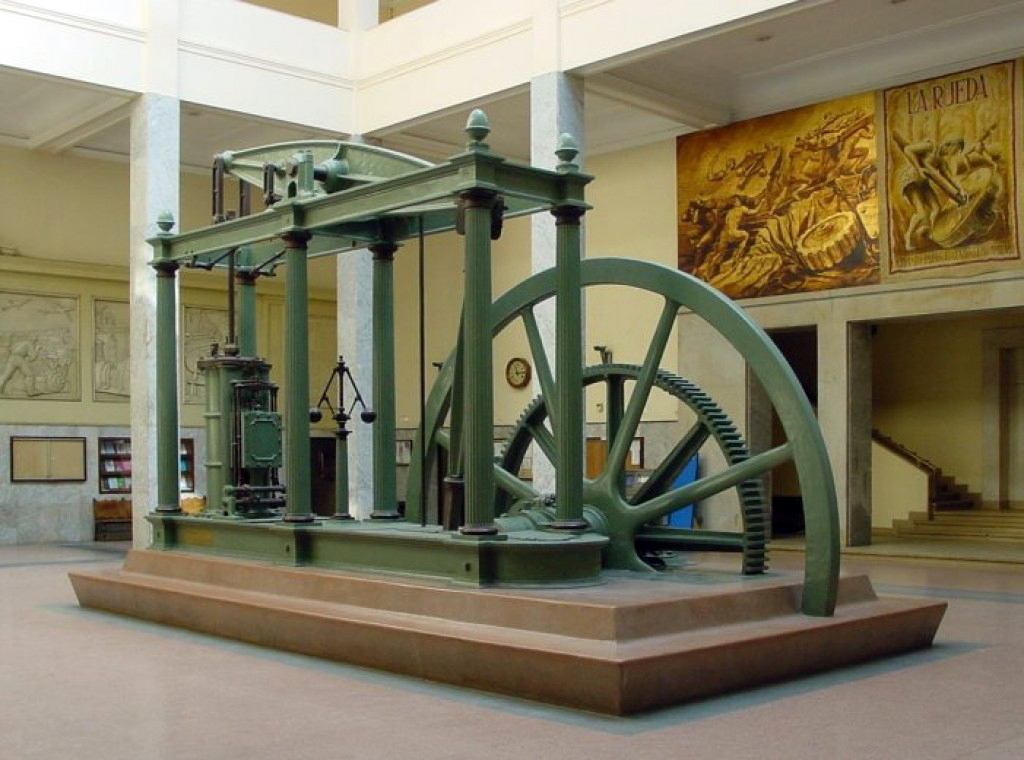
Watt's steam engine (Technical University of Madrid)

Adam Smith's concepts of division of labour and the "invisible hand" of capitalism introduced in his treatise "The Wealth of Nations" motivated many of the technological innovators of the Industrial Revolution to establish and implement factory systems. The efforts of James Watt and Matthew Boulton led to the first integrated machine manufacturing facility in the world, including the implementation of concepts such as cost control systems to reduce waste and increase productivity and the institution of skills training for craftsmen.

Charles Babbage became associated with industrial engineering because of the concepts he introduced in his book "On the Economy of Machinery and Manufacturers" which he wrote as a result of his visits to factories in England and the United States in the early 1800s. The book includes subjects such as the time required to perform a specific task, the effects of subdividing tasks into smaller and less detailed elements, and the advantages to be gained from repetitive tasks.

=== Interchangeable parts ===
Eli Whitney and Simeon North proved the feasibility of the notion of interchangeable parts in the manufacture of muskets and pistols for the US Government. Under this system, individual parts were mass-produced to tolerances to enable their use in any finished product. The result was a significant reduction in the need for skill from specialized workers, which eventually led to the industrial environment to be studied later.

=== Modern development ===
==== Industrial engineering ====
In 1960 to 1975, with the development of decision support systems in supply such as the Material requirements planning (MRP), people can emphasize the timing issue (inventory, production, compounding, transportation, etc.) of industrial organization. Israeli scientist Dr. Jacob Rubinovitz installed the CMMS program developed in IAI and Control-Data (Israel) in 1976 in South Africa and worldwide.

In the seventies, with the penetration of Japanese management theories such as Kaizen and Kanban, Japan realized very high levels of quality and productivity. These theories improved issues of quality, delivery time, and flexibility. Companies in the west realized the great impact of Kaizen and started implementing their own Continuous improvement programs.

In the nineties, following the global industry globalization process, the emphasis was on supply chain management, and customer-oriented business process design. Theory of constraints developed by an Israeli scientist Eliyahu M. Goldratt (1985) is also a significant milestone in the field.

==== Manufacturing (production) engineering ====
Modern manufacturing engineering studies include all intermediate processes required for the production and integration of a product's components.

Some industries, such as semiconductor and steel manufacturers use the term "fabrication" for these processes.

Automation is used in different processes of manufacturing such as machining and welding. Automated manufacturing refers to the application of automation to produce goods in a factory. The main advantages of automated manufacturing for the manufacturing process are realized with effective implementation of automation and include: higher consistency and quality, reduction of lead times, simplification of production, reduced handling, improved work flow, and improved worker morale.

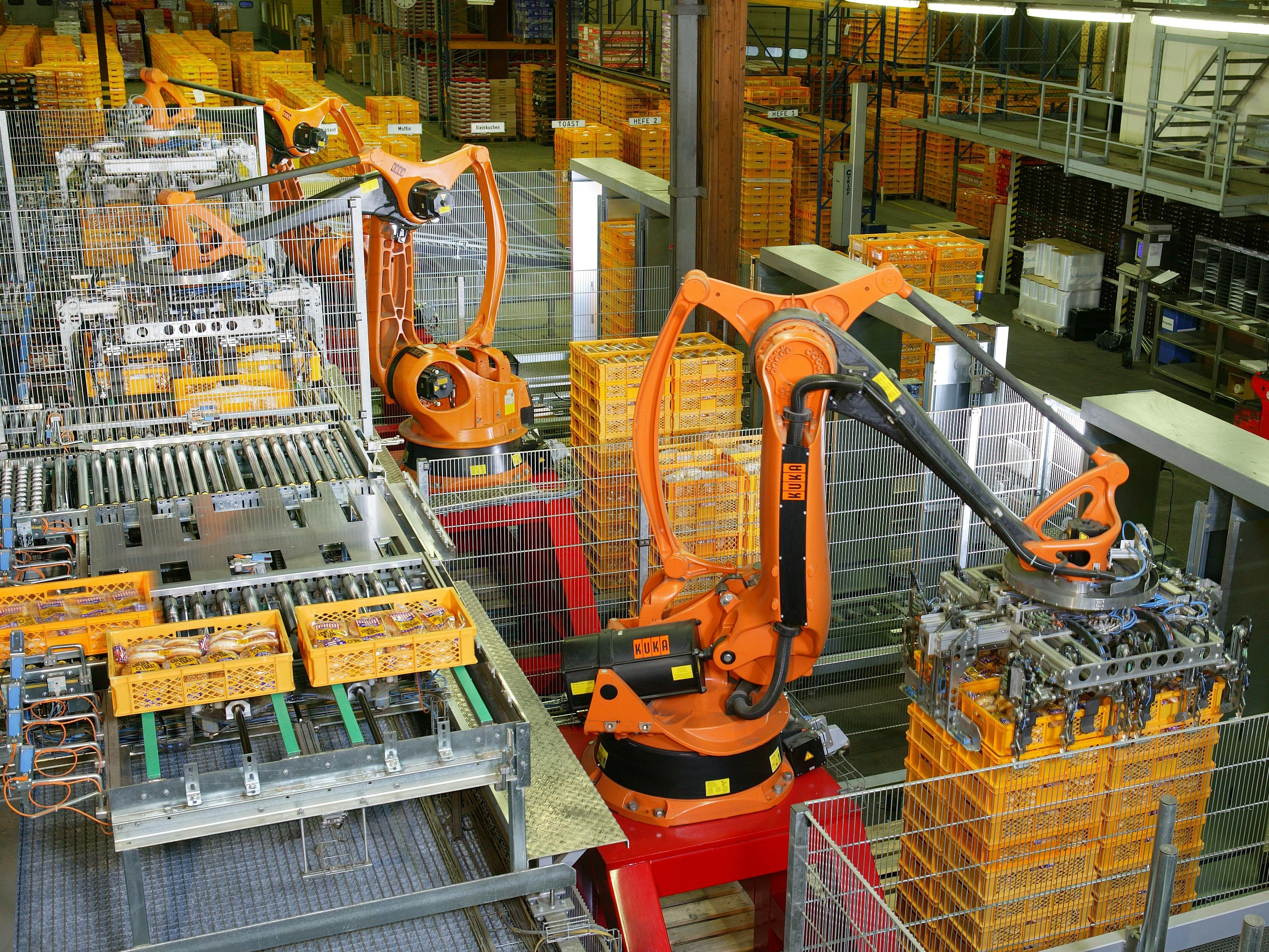
KUKA industrial robots being used at a bakery for food production

Robotics is the application of mechatronics and automation to create robots, which are often used in manufacturing to perform tasks that are dangerous, unpleasant, or repetitive. These robots may be of any shape and size, but all are preprogrammed and interact physically with the world. To create a robot, an engineer typically employs kinematics (to determine the robot's range of motion) and mechanics (to determine the stresses within the robot). Robots are used extensively in manufacturing engineering.

Robots allow businesses to save money on labor, perform tasks that are either too dangerous or too precise for humans to perform economically, and to ensure better quality. Many companies employ assembly lines of robots, and some factories are so robotized that they can run by themselves. Outside the factory, robots have been employed in bomb disposal, space exploration, and many other fields. Robots are also sold for various residential applications.

== Overview ==
=== Industrial engineering ===
Industrial engineering is the branch of engineering that involves figuring out how to make or do things better. Industrial engineers are concerned with reducing production costs, increasing efficiency, improving the quality of products and services, ensuring worker health and safety, protecting the environment and complying with government regulations.

The various fields and topics that industrial engineers are involved with include:

- Manufacturing engineering
- Engineering management
- Process engineering: design, operation, control, and optimization of chemical, physical, and biological processes.
- Systems engineering: an interdisciplinary field of engineering that focuses on how to design and manage complex engineering systems over their life cycles.
- Software engineering: an interdisciplinary field of engineering that focusing on design, development, maintenance, testing, and evaluation of the software that make computers or other devices containing software work
- Safety engineering: an engineering discipline which assures that engineered systems provide acceptable levels of safety.
- Data science: the science of exploring, manipulating, analyzing, and visualizing data to derive useful insights and conclusions
- Machine learning: the automation of learning from data using models and algorithms
- Analytics and data mining: the discovery, interpretation, and extraction of patterns and insights from large quantities of data
- Cost engineering: practice devoted to the management of project cost, involving such activities as cost- and control- estimating, which is cost control and cost forecasting, investment appraisal, and risk analysis.
- Value engineering: a systematic method to improve the "value" of goods or products and services by using an examination of function.
- Predetermined motion time system: a technique to quantify time required for repetitive tasks.
- Quality engineering: a way of preventing mistakes or defects in manufactured products and avoiding problems when delivering solutions or services to customers.
- Project management: is the process and activity of planning, organizing, motivating, and controlling resources, procedures and protocols to achieve specific goals in scientific or daily problems.
- Supply chain management: the management of the flow of goods. It includes the movement and storage of raw materials, work-in-process inventory, and finished goods from point of origin to point of consumption.
- Ergonomics: the practice of designing products, systems or processes to take proper account of the interaction between them and the people that use them.
- Operations research, also known as management science: discipline that deals with the application of advanced analytical methods to help make better decisions
- Operations management: an area of management concerned with overseeing, designing, and controlling the process of production and redesigning business operations in the production of goods or services.
- Job design: the specification of contents, methods and relationship of jobs in order to satisfy technological and organizational requirements as well as the social and personal requirements of the job holder.
- Industrial plant configuration: sizing of necessary infrastructure used in support and maintenance of a given facility.
- Facility management: an interdisciplinary field devoted to the coordination of space, infrastructure, people and organization
- Engineering design process: formulation of a plan to help an engineer build a product with a specified performance goal.
- Logistics: the management of the flow of goods between the point of origin and the point of consumption in order to meet some requirements, of customers or corporations.
- Accounting: the measurement, processing and communication of financial information about economic entities
- Capital projects: the management of activities in capital projects involves the flow of resources, or inputs, as they are transformed into outputs. Many of the tools and principles of industrial engineering can be applied to the configuration of work activities within a project. The application of industrial engineering and operations management concepts and techniques to the execution of projects has been thus referred to as Project Production Management. Traditionally, a major aspect of industrial engineering was planning the layouts of factories and designing assembly lines and other manufacturing paradigms. And now, in lean manufacturing systems, industrial engineers work to eliminate wastes of time, money, materials, energy, and other resources.

Examples of where industrial engineering might be used include flow process charting, process mapping, designing an assembly workstation, strategizing for various operational logistics, consulting as an efficiency expert, developing a new financial algorithm or loan system for a bank, streamlining operation and emergency room location or usage in a hospital, planning complex distribution schemes for materials or products (referred to as supply-chain management), and shortening lines (or queues) at a bank, hospital, or a theme park.

Modern industrial engineers typically use predetermined motion time system, computer simulation (especially discrete event simulation), along with extensive mathematical tools for modeling, such as mathematical optimization and queueing theory, and computational methods for system analysis, evaluation, and optimization. Industrial engineers also use the tools of data science and machine learning in their work owing to the strong relatedness of these disciplines with the field and the similar technical background required of industrial engineers (including a strong foundation in probability theory, linear algebra, and statistics, as well as having coding skills).

=== Manufacturing (production) engineering ===
Manufacturing Engineering is based on core industrial engineering and mechanical engineering skills, adding important elements from mechatronics, commerce, economics and business management. This field also deals with the integration of different facilities and systems for producing quality products (with optimal expenditure) by applying the principles of physics and the results of manufacturing systems studies, such as the following:

- Craft or Guild
- Putting-out system
- British factory system
- American system of manufacturing
- Soviet collectivism in manufacturing
- Mass production
- Computer integrated manufacturing
- Computer-aided technologies in manufacturing
- Just in time manufacturing
- Lean manufacturing
- Flexible manufacturing
- Mass customization
- Agile manufacturing
- Rapid manufacturing
- Prefabrication
- Ownership
- Fabrication
- Publication

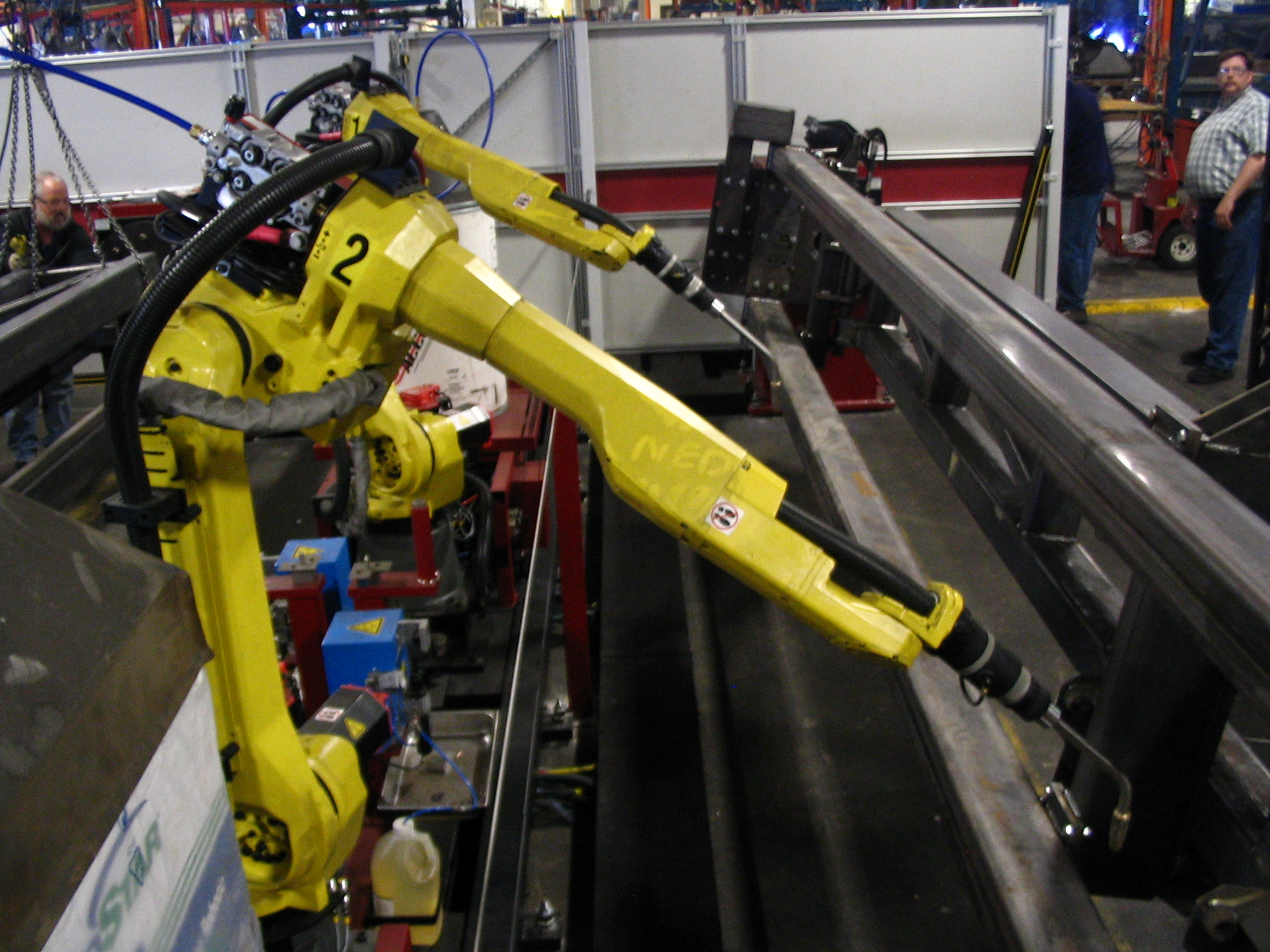
A set of six-axis robots used for welding.

Manufacturing engineers develop and create physical artifacts, production processes, and technology. It is a very broad area which includes the design and development of products. Manufacturing engineering is considered to be a sub-discipline of industrial engineering/systems engineering and has very strong overlaps with mechanical engineering. Manufacturing engineers' success or failure directly impacts the advancement of technology and the spread of innovation. This field of manufacturing engineering emerged from tool and die discipline in the early 20th century. It expanded greatly from the 1960s when industrialized countries introduced factories with:

1. Numerical control machine tools and automated systems of production.

2. Advanced statistical methods of quality control: These factories were pioneered by the American electrical engineer William Edwards Deming, who was initially ignored by his home country. The same methods of quality control later turned Japanese factories into world leaders in cost-effectiveness and production quality.

3. Industrial robots on the factory floor, introduced in the late 1970s: These computer-controlled welding arms and grippers could perform simple tasks such as attaching a car door quickly and flawlessly 24 hours a day. This cut costs and improved production speed.

== Education ==
=== Industrial engineering ===
==== Undergraduate curriculum ====
In the United States the undergraduate degree earned is the Bachelor of Science (B.S.) or Bachelor of Science and Engineering (B.S.E.) in Industrial Engineering (IE). Variations of the title include Industrial & Operations Engineering (IOE), and Industrial & Systems Engineering (ISE). The typical curriculum includes a broad math and science foundation spanning chemistry, physics, mechanics (i.e., statics, kinematics, and dynamics), materials science, computer science, electronics/circuits, engineering design, and the standard range of engineering mathematics (i.e. calculus, linear algebra, differential equations, statistics). For any engineering undergraduate program to be accredited, regardless of concentration, it must cover a largely similar span of such foundational work – which also overlaps heavily with the content tested on one or more engineering licensure exams in most jurisdictions.

The coursework specific to IE entails specialized courses in areas such as optimization, applied probability, stochastic modeling, design of experiments, statistical process control, simulation, manufacturing engineering, ergonomics/safety engineering, and engineering economics. Industrial engineering elective courses typically cover more specialized topics in areas such as manufacturing, supply chains and logistics, analytics and machine learning, production systems, human factors and industrial design, and service systems.

Certain business schools may offer programs with some overlapping relevance to IE, but the engineering programs are distinguished by a much more intensely quantitative focus, required engineering science electives, and the core math and science courses required of all engineering programs.

==== Graduate curriculum ====
The usual graduate degree earned is the Master of Science (MS) or Master of Science and Engineering (MSE) in Industrial Engineering or various alternative related concentration titles. Typical MS curricula may cover:

- Operations research and optimization techniques
- Engineering economics
- Supply chain management and logistics
- Systems simulation and stochastic processes
- Analytics and machine learning
- Manufacturing systems/manufacturing engineering
- Human factors engineering and ergonomics (safety engineering)
- Production planning and control
- System analysis and techniques
- Management sciences
- Computer-aided manufacturing
- Lean Six Sigma
- Financial engineering
- Facilities design and work-space design
- Quality engineering
- Reliability engineering and life testing
- Statistical process control or quality control
- Time and motion study
- Predetermined motion time system and computer use for IE
- Operations management
- Project management
- Productivity improvement
- Materials management
- Robotics
- Product development
- System dynamics and policy planning

=== Manufacturing (production) engineering ===
==== Degree certification programs ====
Manufacturing engineers possess an associate's or bachelor's degree in engineering with a major in manufacturing engineering. The length of study for such a degree is usually two to five years followed by five more years of professional practice to qualify as a professional engineer. Working as a manufacturing engineering technologist involves a more applications-oriented qualification path.

Academic degrees for manufacturing engineers are usually the Associate or Bachelor of Engineering, [BE] or [BEng], and the Associate or Bachelor of Science, [BS] or [BSc]. For manufacturing technologists the required degrees are Associate or Bachelor of Technology [B.TECH] or Associate or Bachelor of Applied Science [BASc] in Manufacturing, depending upon the university. Master's degrees in engineering manufacturing include Master of Engineering [ME] or [MEng] in Manufacturing, Master of Science [M.Sc] in Manufacturing Management, Master of Science [M.Sc] in Industrial and Production Management, and Master of Science [M.Sc] as well as Master of Engineering [ME] in Design, which is a subdiscipline of manufacturing. Doctoral [PhD] or [DEng] level courses in manufacturing are also available depending on the university.

The undergraduate degree curriculum generally includes courses in physics, mathematics, computer science, project management, and specific topics in mechanical and manufacturing engineering. Initially such topics cover most, if not all, of the subdisciplines of manufacturing engineering. Students then choose to specialize in one or more sub disciplines towards the end of their degree work.

Specific to Industrial Engineers, people will see courses covering ergonomics, scheduling, inventory management, forecasting, product development, and in general courses that focus on optimization. Most colleges breakdown the large sections of industrial engineering into Healthcare, Ergonomics, Product Development, or Consulting sectors. This allows for the student to get a good grasp on each of the varying sub-sectors so they know what area they are most interested about pursuing a career in.

==== Undergraduate curriculum ====
The Foundational Curriculum for a bachelor's degree of Manufacturing Engineering or Production Engineering includes below mentioned Syllabus. This Syllabus is closely related to Industrial Engineering and Mechanical Engineering. But it Differs by Placing more Emphasis on Manufacturing Science or Production Science. It includes following:

- Mathematics (Calculus, Differential Equations, Statistics and Linear Algebra)
- Mechanics (Statics & Dynamics)
- Solid Mechanics
- Fluid Mechanics
- Materials Science
- Strength of Materials
- Fluid Dynamics
- Hydraulics
- Pneumatics
- HVAC (Heating, Ventilation & Air Conditioning)
- Heat Transfer
- Applied Thermodynamics
- Energy conversion
- Instrumentation and Measurement
- Engineering Drawing (Drafting) & Engineering Design
- Engineering Graphics
- Mechanism Design including Kinematics and Dynamics
- Manufacturing Processes
- Mechatronics
- Circuit analysis
- Lean manufacturing
- Automation
- Reverse Engineering
- Quality Control
- CAD (Computer aided Design which includes Solid Modelling) and CAM (Computer aided Manufacturing)

A degree in Manufacturing Engineering versus Mechanical Engineering will typically differ only by a few specialized classes. Mechanical Engineering degree focuses more on the Product Design Process and on Complex Products which requires more Mathematics Expertise.

== Manufacturing engineering certification ==
=== Professional engineering license ===
A Professional Engineer, PE, is a licensed engineer who is permitted to offer professional services to the public. Professional Engineers may prepare, sign, seal, and submit engineering plans to the public. Before a candidate can become a professional engineer, they will need to receive a bachelor's degree from an ABET recognized university in the US, take and pass the Fundamentals of Engineering exam to become an "engineer-in-training", and work four years under the supervision of a professional engineer. After those tasks are complete the candidate will be able to take the PE exam. Upon receiving a passing score on the test, the candidate will receive their PE License .

=== Society of Manufacturing Engineers (SME) certifications (USA) ===
The SME (society) administers qualifications specifically for the manufacturing industry. These are not degree level qualifications and are not recognized at the professional engineering level. The SME offers two certifications for Manufacturing engineers: Certified Manufacturing Technologist Certificate (CMfgT) and Certified Manufacturing Engineer (CMfgE).

==== Certified manufacturing technologist ====
Qualified candidates for the Certified Manufacturing Technologist Certificate (CMfgT) must pass a three-hour, 130-question multiple-choice exam. The exam covers math, manufacturing processes, manufacturing management, automation, and related subjects. A score of 60% or higher must be achieved to pass the exam. Additionally, a candidate must have at least four years of combined education and manufacturing-related work experience. The CMfgT certification must be renewed every three years in order to stay certified.

==== Certified manufacturing engineer ====
Certified Manufacturing Engineer (CMfgE) is an engineering qualification administered by the Society of Manufacturing Engineers, Dearborn, Michigan, USA. Candidates qualifying for a Certified Manufacturing Engineer credential must pass a four-hour, 180 question multiple-choice exam which covers more in-depth topics than does the CMfgT exam. A score of 60% or higher must be achieved to pass the exam. CMfgE candidates must also have eight years of combined education and manufacturing-related work experience, with a minimum of four years of work experience. The CMfgT certification must be renewed every three years in order to stay certified.

== Research ==
=== Industrial engineering ===
==== Human factors ====
The human factors area specializes in exploring how systems fit the people who must operate them, determining the roles of people with the systems, and selecting those people who can best fit particular roles within these systems. Students who focus on Human Factors will be able to work with a multidisciplinary team of faculty with strengths in understanding cognitive behavior as it relates to automation, air and ground transportation, medical studies, and space exploration.

==== Production systems ====
The production systems area develops new solutions in areas such as engineering design, supply chain management (e.g. supply chain system design, error recovery, large scale systems), manufacturing (e.g. system design, planning and scheduling), and medicine (e.g. disease diagnosis, discovery of medical knowledge). Students who focus on production systems will be able to work on topics related to computational intelligence theories for applications in industry, healthcare, and service organizations.

==== Reliability systems ====
The objective of the reliability systems area is to provide students with advanced data analysis and decision making techniques that will improve quality and reliability of complex systems. Students who focus on system reliability and uncertainty will be able to work on areas related to contemporary reliability systems including integration of quality and reliability, simultaneous life cycle design for manufacturing systems, decision theory in quality and reliability engineering, condition-based maintenance and degradation modeling, discrete event simulation and decision analysis.

==== Wind power management ====
Wind power management programs aim to meet the emerging needs for students involved in design, operations, and management of wind farms deployed in massive numbers all over the country. Students in this field will be able to analyse and work on system and management issues of wind farms, and their interactions with power generation systems.

=== Production (manufacturing) engineering ===
==== Flexible manufacturing systems ====
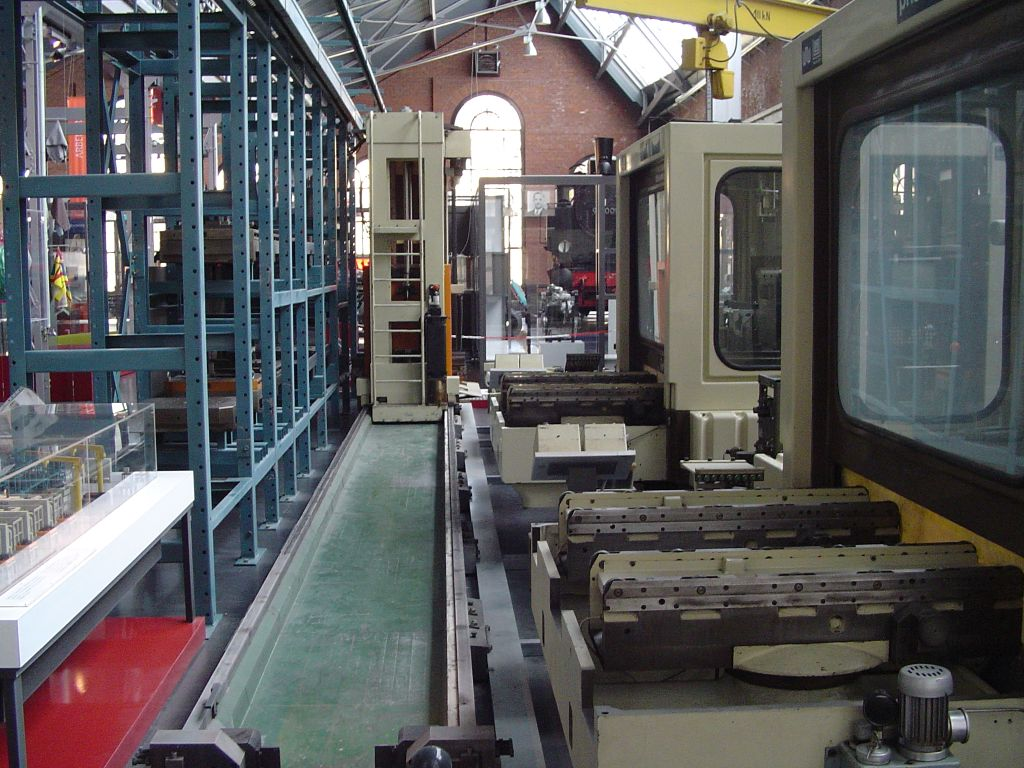
A typical FMS system

A flexible manufacturing system (FMS) is a manufacturing system in which there is some amount of flexibility that allows the system to react to changes, whether predicted or unpredicted. This flexibility is generally considered to fall into two categories, both of which have numerous subcategories. The first category, machine flexibility, covers the system's ability to be changed to produce new product types and the ability to change the order of operations executed on a part. The second category, called routing flexibility, consists of the ability to use multiple machines to perform the same operation on a part, as well as the system's ability to absorb large-scale changes, such as in volume, capacity, or capability.

Most FMS systems comprise three main systems. The work machines, which are often automated CNC machines, are connected by a material handling system to optimize parts flow, and to a central control computer, which controls material movements and machine flow. The main advantages of an FMS is its high flexibility in managing manufacturing resources like time and effort in order to manufacture a new product. The best application of an FMS is found in the production of small sets of products from a mass production.

==== Computer integrated manufacturing ====
Computer-integrated manufacturing (CIM) in engineering is a method of manufacturing in which the entire production process is controlled by computer. Traditionally separated process methods are joined through a computer by CIM. This integration allows the processes to exchange information and to initiate actions. Through this integration, manufacturing can be faster and less error-prone, although the main advantage is the ability to create automated manufacturing processes. Typically CIM relies on closed-loop control processes based on real-time input from sensors. It is also known as flexible design and manufacturing.

==== Friction stir welding ====
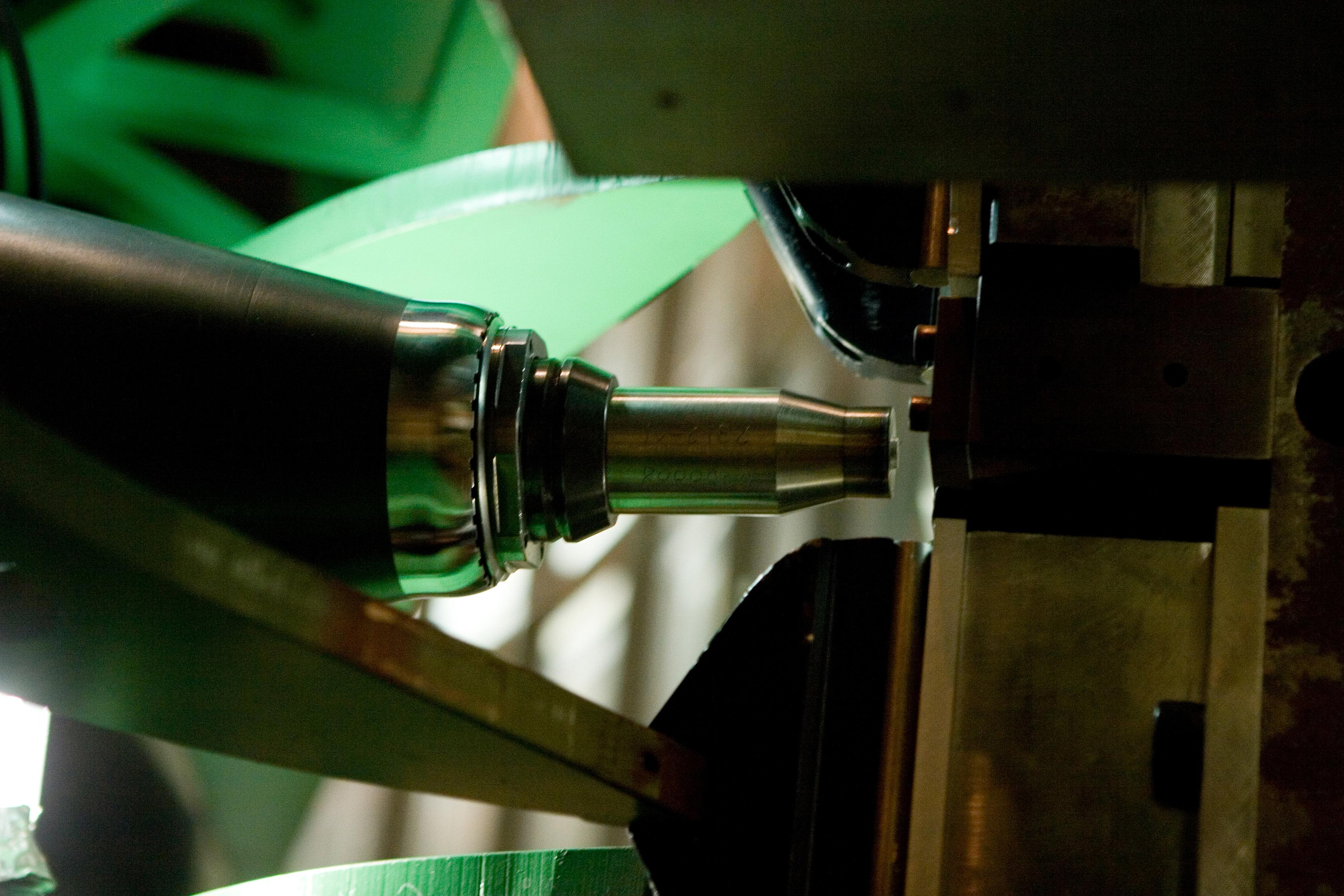
Close-up view of a friction stir weld tack tool

Friction stir welding was discovered in 1991 by The Welding Institute (TWI). This innovative steady state (non-fusion) welding technique joins previously un-weldable materials, including several aluminum alloys. It may play an important role in the future construction of airplanes, potentially replacing rivets. Current uses of this technology to date include: welding the seams of the aluminum main space shuttle external tank, the Orion Crew Vehicle test article, Boeing Delta II and Delta IV Expendable Launch Vehicles and the SpaceX Falcon 1 rocket; armor plating for amphibious assault ships; and welding the wings and fuselage panels of the new Eclipse 500 aircraft from Eclipse Aviation, among an increasingly growing range of uses.

== Employment ==
=== Industrial engineering ===
The total number of engineers employed in the US in 2015 was roughly 1.6 million. Of these, 272,470 were industrial engineers (16.92%), the third most popular engineering specialty. The median salaries by experience level are $62,000 with 0–5 years experience, $75,000 with 5–10 years experience, and $81,000 with 10–20 years experience. The average starting salaries were $55,067 with a bachelor's degree, $77,364 with a master's degree, and $100,759 with a doctorate degree. This places industrial engineering at 7th of 15 among engineering bachelor's degrees, 3rd of 10 among master's degrees, and 2nd of 7 among doctorate degrees in average annual salary. The median annual income of industrial engineers in the U.S. workforce is $83,470.

=== Production (manufacturing) engineering ===
Manufacturing engineers are closely connected with engineering and industrial design efforts. Examples of major companies that employ manufacturing engineers in the United States include General Motors Corporation, Ford Motor Company, Chrysler, Boeing, Gates Corporation and Pfizer. Examples in Europe include Airbus, Daimler, BMW, Fiat, Navistar International, and Michelin Tyre.

=== Related industries ===
Industries where industrial and production engineers are generally employed include:

- Aerospace industry
- Automotive industry
- Chemical industry
- Computer industry
- Electronics industry
- Food processing industry
- Garment industry
- Pharmaceutical industry
- Plastic packaging
- Pulp and paper industry
- Toy industry

== Modern tools ==
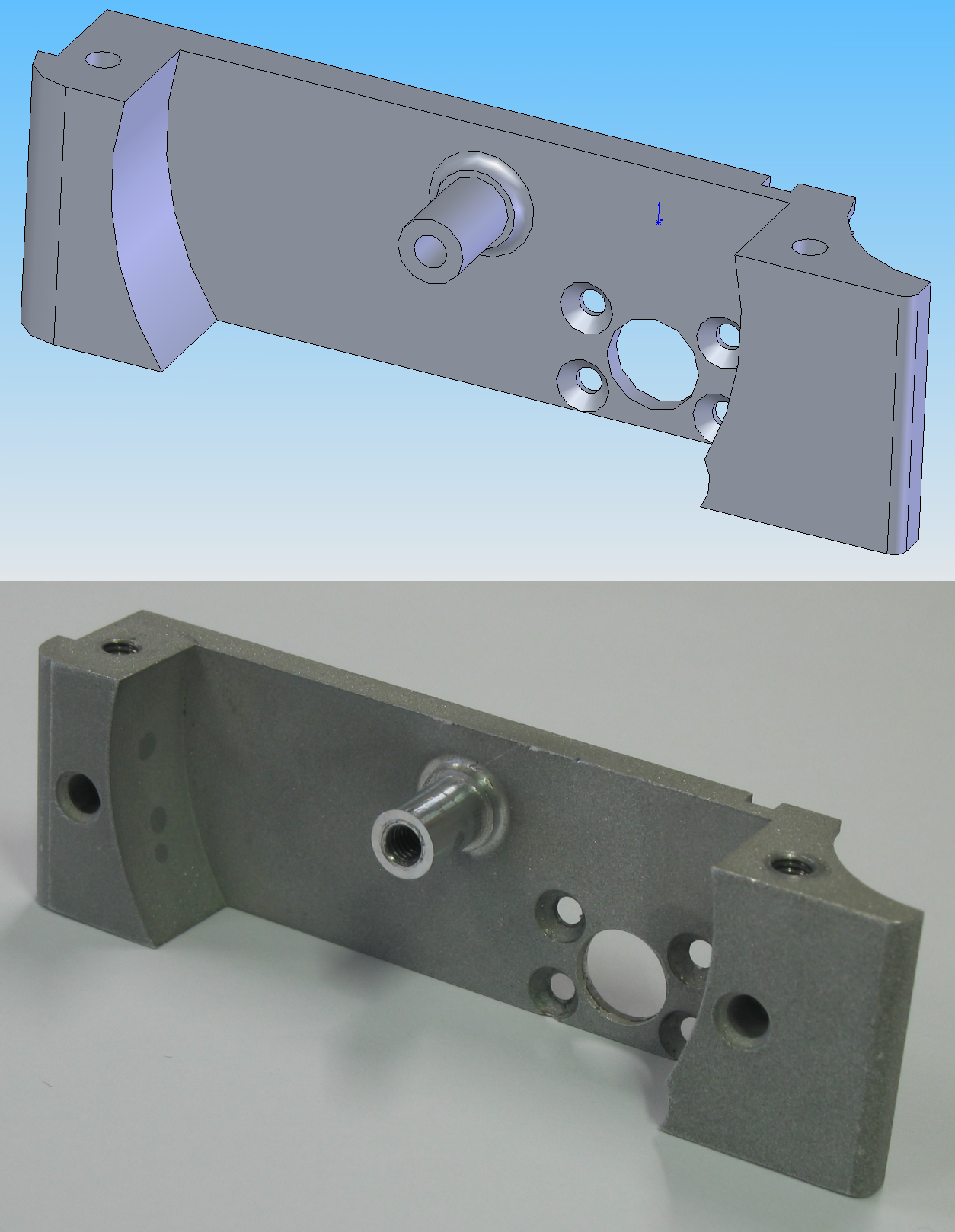
CAD model and CNC machined part

Many manufacturing companies, especially those in industrialized nations, have begun to incorporate computer-aided engineering (CAE) programs, such as SolidWorks and AutoCAD, into their existing design and analysis processes, including 2D and 3D solid modeling computer-aided design (CAD). This method has many benefits, including easier and more exhaustive visualization of products, the ability to create virtual assemblies of parts, and ease of use in designing mating interfaces and tolerances.

Screen Shot Captured from SolidWorks.

=== SolidWorks ===
SolidWorks is an example of a CAD modeling computer program developed by Dassault Systèmes. SolidWorks is an industry standard for drafting designs and specifications for physical objects and has been used by more than 165,000 companies as of 2013.

=== AutoCAD ===
AutoCAD is an example of a CAD modeling computer program developed by Autodesk. AutoCad is also widely used for CAD modeling and CAE.

Other CAE programs commonly used by product manufacturers include product life cycle management (PLM) tools and analysis tools used to perform complex simulations. Analysis tools may be used to predict product response to expected loads, including fatigue life and manufacturability. These tools include finite element analysis (FEA), computational fluid dynamics (CFD), and computer-aided manufacturing (CAM). Using CAE programs, a mechanical design team can quickly and cheaply iterate the design process to develop a product that better meets cost, performance, and other constraints. There is no need to create a physical prototype until the design nears completion, allowing hundreds or thousands of designs to be evaluated, instead of relatively few. In addition, CAE analysis programs can model complicated physical phenomena which cannot be solved by hand, such as viscoelasticity, complex contact between mating parts, or non-Newtonian flows.

Just as manufacturing engineering is linked with other disciplines, such as mechatronics, multidisciplinary design optimization (MDO) is also being used with other CAE programs to automate and improve the iterative design process. MDO tools wrap around existing CAE processes by automating the process of trial and error method used by classical engineers. MDO uses a computer based algorithm that will iteratively seek better alternatives from an initial guess within given constants. MDO uses this procedure to determine the best design outcome and lists various options as well.

== Sub-disciplines ==
=== Mechanics ===
Mohr's circle, a common tool to study stresses in a mechanical element

Classical Mechanics, attempts to use Newtons basic laws of motion to describe how a body will react when that body undergoes a force. However modern mechanics includes the rather recent quantum theory. Sub disciplines of mechanics include:

Classical Mechanics:

- Statics, the study of non-moving bodies at equilibrium.
- Kinematics, is the study of the motion of bodies (objects) and systems (groups of objects), while ignoring the forces that cause the motion.
- Dynamics (or kinetics), the study of how forces affect moving bodies.
- Mechanics of materials, the study of how different materials deform under various types of stress.
- Fluid mechanics, the study of how the principles of classical mechanics are observed with liquids and gases.
- Continuum mechanics, a method of applying mechanics that assumes that objects are continuous (rather than discrete)

Quantum:

- Quantum mechanics, the study of atoms, molecules, electrons, protons, and neutrons on a sub atomic scale. This type of mechanics attempts to explain their motion and physical properties within an atom.

If the engineering project were to design a vehicle, statics might be employed to design the frame of the vehicle in order to evaluate where the stresses will be most intense. Dynamics might be used when designing the car's engine to evaluate the forces in the pistons and cams as the engine cycles. Mechanics of materials might be used to choose appropriate materials for the manufacture of the frame and engine. Fluid mechanics might be used to design a ventilation system for the vehicle or to design the intake system for the engine.

=== Drafting ===
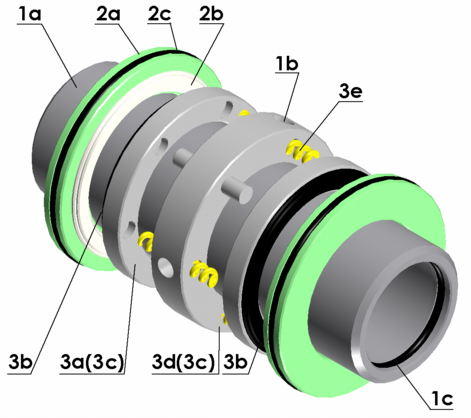
A CAD model of a mechanical double seal

Drafting or technical drawing is the means by which manufacturers create instructions for manufacturing parts. A technical drawing can be a computer model or hand-drawn schematic showing all the dimensions necessary to manufacture a part, as well as assembly notes, a list of required materials, and other pertinent information. A skilled worker who creates technical drawings may be referred to as a drafter or draftsman. Drafting has historically been a two-dimensional process, but computer-aided design (CAD) programs now allow the designer to create in three dimensions. Instructions for manufacturing a part must be fed to the necessary machinery, either manually, through programmed instructions, or through the use of a computer-aided manufacturing (CAM) or combined CAD/CAM program. Programs such as SolidWorks and AutoCAD are examples of programs used to draft new parts and products under development.

Optionally, an engineer may also manually manufacture a part using the technical drawings, but this is becoming an increasing rarity with the advent of computer numerically controlled (CNC) manufacturing. Engineers primarily manufacture parts manually in the areas of applied spray coatings, finishes, and other processes that cannot economically or practically be done by a machine.

Drafting is used in nearly every sub discipline of mechanical and manufacturing engineering, and by many other branches of engineering and architecture. Three-dimensional models created using CAD software are also commonly used in finite element analysis (FEA) and computational fluid dynamics (CFD).

=== Metal fabrication and machine tools ===
Metal fabrication is the building of metal structures by cutting, bending, and assembling processes. Technologies such as electron beam melting, laser engineered net shape, and direct metal laser sintering has allowed for the production of metal structures to become much less difficult when compared to other conventional metal fabrication methods. These help to alleviate various issues when the idealized CAD structures do not align with the actual fabricated structure.

Machine tools employ many types of tools that do the cutting or shaping of materials. Machine tools usually include many components consisting of motors, levers, arms, pulleys, and other basic simple systems to create a complex system that can build various things. All of these components must work correctly in order to stay on schedule and remain on task. Machine tools aim to efficiently and effectively produce good parts at a quick pace with a small amount of error.

=== Computer integrated manufacturing ===
Computer-integrated manufacturing (CIM) is the manufacturing approach of using computers to control the entire production process. Computer-integrated manufacturing is used in automotive, aviation, space, and ship building industries. Computer-integrated manufacturing allows for data, through various sensing mechanisms to be observed during manufacturing. This type of manufacturing has computers controlling and observing every part of the process. This gives CIM a unique advantage over other manufacturing processes.

=== Mechatronics ===
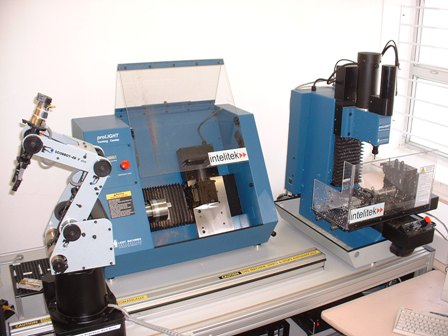
Training FMS with learning robot SCORBOT-ER 4u, workbench CNC mill and CNC lathe

Mechatronics is an engineering discipline that deals with the convergence of electrical, mechanical and manufacturing systems. Examples include automated manufacturing systems, heating, ventilation and air-conditioning systems, and various aircraft and automobile subsystems. A mechatronic system typically includes a mechanical skeleton, motors, controllers, sensors, actuators, and digital hardware. Mechatronics is greatly used in various applications of industrial processes and in automation. The term mechatronics is typically used to refer to macroscopic systems, but futurists have predicted the emergence of very small electromechanical devices. Already such small devices, known as Microelectromechanical systems (MEMS), are used in automobiles to initiate the deployment of airbags, in digital projectors to create sharper images, and in inkjet printers to create nozzles for high-definition printing. In future it is hoped that such devices will be used in tiny implantable medical devices and to improve optical communication.

=== Textile engineering ===
Textile engineering courses deal with the application of scientific and engineering principles to the design and control of all aspects of fiber, textile, and apparel processes, products, and machinery. These include natural and man-made materials, interaction of materials with machines, safety and health, energy conservation, and waste and pollution control. Additionally, students are given experience in plant design and layout, machine and wet process design and improvement, and designing and creating textile products. Throughout the textile engineering curriculum, students take classes from other engineering and disciplines including: mechanical, chemical, materials and industrial engineering.

=== Advanced composite materials ===
Advanced composite materials (engineering) (ACMs) are also known as advanced polymer matrix composites. These are generally characterized or determined by unusually high strength fibres with unusually high stiffness, or modulus of elasticity characteristics, compared to other materials, while bound together by weaker matrices. Advanced composite materials have broad, proven applications, in the aircraft, aerospace, and sports equipment sectors. Even more specifically ACMs are very attractive for aircraft and aerospace structural parts. Manufacturing ACMs is a multibillion-dollar industry worldwide. Composite products range from skateboards to components of the space shuttle. The industry can be generally divided into two basic segments, industrial composites and advanced composites.

== See also ==
- Washington Accord
- Automotive engineering
- Computer-aided design
- Computer numerically controlled
- Engineering
- Industrial Revolution
- Kinematics
- Manufacturing
- Manufacturing engineering education
- Mechatronics
- Mechanical engineering
- Mechanics
- Occupational health and safety
- Package engineering
- Robotics
- Second Industrial Revolution
- Surface-mount technology
- Technical drawing

Associations

- American Society for Engineering Education
- American Society for Quality
- European Students of Industrial Engineering and Management (ESTIEM)
- Indian Institution of Industrial Engineering
- Institute for Operations Research and the Management Sciences (INFORMS)
- Institute of Industrial Engineers
- Institution of Electrical Engineers
- Society of Manufacturing Engineers
