= List of industrial engineers =

This is a list of notable industrial engineers, people who were trained in or practiced industrial engineering who have established prominence in their profession.

== A ==
- Bud Adams – oil tycoon and owner of the Tennessee Titans.
- Ravindra K. Ahuja – editor of journals Operations Research, Transportation Science, and Networks
- Horace Lucian Arnold – American engineer, inventor, engineering journalist, and early writer on management

== B ==
- Ali Babacan – State Minister for Economy of Republic of Turkey (Middle East Technical University)
- Carl Georg Barth – Norwegian-American mathematician and mechanical engineer who improved and popularized the industrial use of compound slide rules
- Leslie Benmark – known for work in engineering education, specifically accreditation
- Karen Bursic – American professor and undergraduate program director at University of Pittsburgh

== C ==
- Alexander Hamilton Church – English efficiency engineer, accountant and early writer on accountancy and management
- Richard W. Conway – Emerson Electric Company Professor of Manufacturing Management, Emeritus, at Cornell University
- Tim Cook – Chief Executive Officer of Apple Inc. (Auburn University) aug 2011
- Roger Corman – American film producer and director (Stanford University)
- Nancy Currie – astronaut

== D ==
- John Dasburg – former CEO of Northwest Airlines and Burger King (University of Florida)
- John Z. DeLorean – former General Motors executive; founder of DeLorean Motors
- W. Edwards Deming – forerunner of Total Quality Management (TQC)
- Mike Duke – President and CEO of Wal-Mart Stores USA (Georgia Institute of Technology)

== E ==
- Harrington Emerson – American efficiency engineer and early management theorist
- A. K. Erlang – communications, queueing (University of Copenhagen)
- Michael Eskew – CEO of United Parcel Service (Purdue University)

== F ==
- Adel Fakeih – Saudi Arabian politician
- Giacomo Ferrari – Italian politician and mayor of Parma
- Henry Ford – founder of the Ford Motor Company; revolutionized industrial production by being the first to apply assembly line manufacturing to a production process
- Joe Forehand – Chairman of the board and former CEO of Accenture (Auburn University)

== G ==
- Henry Gantt – inventor of the Gantt chart
- Frank Gilbreth – time and motion studies
- Lillian Gilbreth – time and motion studies (University of California, Berkeley)
- Samuel Ginn – wireless communications pioneer; former chairman of Vodafone (Auburn University)
- Joe Girardi – manager, Florida Marlins and New York Yankees (Northwestern University)
- Eliyahu M. Goldratt – inventor of the theory of constraints
- Carlos Ghosn – former CEO of Nissan, Mitsubishi, Renault

== H ==
- Joe Hardy – founder and CEO of 84 Lumber (University of Pittsburgh)
- Homer Hickam – NASA engineer; author of The Coalwood Way, Rocket Boys, October Sky, Torpedo Junction and Back to the Moon (Virginia Tech)
- Charles O. Holliday – CEO of DuPont (University of Tennessee)
- Linda Hudson – President and CEO of BAE Systems Inc. (University of Florida)

== I ==
- Lee Iacocca – former CEO of Chrysler (Lehigh University)

== K ==
- Shahid Khan – owner of automotive parts manufacturer Flex-N-Gate and the Jacksonville Jaguars
- Charles Edward Knoeppel – American organizational theorist, consultant, and early management author
- Dick Kovacevich – CEO of Wells Fargo

== L ==
- Lars Lallerstedt – pioneer of Swedish industrial design.
- Tom Landry – former Dallas Cowboys Coach (University of Houston).
- Manny Lawson – active Buffalo Bills player (North Carolina State University).
- J. Slater Lewis – British engineer, inventor, business manager, and early author on management and accounting.

== M ==
- William L. Maxwell – Andrew Schultz Jr. Emeritus Professor of Industrial Engineering at Cornell University
- Lydia Meredith – CEO of the Renaissance Learning Center
- Francesco Merloni – Italian industrialist and politician
- Captain Henry Metcalfe – American Army ordnance officer, inventor and early organizational theorist
- Edwin Moses – world record hurdler
- John Muir – founder of Sierra Club
- Alphonse Munchen – Luxembourgian engineer and Mayor of Luxembourg City
- Richard Muther – consultant; author of several influential books on plant layout and material handling

== N ==
- Shimon Y. Nof – Professor of Industrial Engineering at Purdue University; creator and Head of the PRISM (Production and Robotics Software for Manufacturing and Management) lab

== O ==
- Taiichi Ohno – "father of the Toyota Production System", also known as Just In Time

== P ==
- R.K. Pachauri – Chairman of the Intergovernmental Panel on Climate Change and Director, Tata Energy Research Institute
- Oscar E. Perrigo – American mechanical engineer, inventor, and early technical and management author
- Guy Primus – COO of Overbrook Entertainment (Georgia Institute of Technology)
- A. Alan Pritsker – industrial engineer and teacher, pioneer of computer simulation languages (Purdue University)

== Q ==
- Jorge Quiroga – former president of Bolivia (Texas A&M University)

== R ==
- Jacob Rubinovitz – developer of instructional computer-integrated manufacturing and the robotics lab at the Faculty of Industrial Engineering and Management of the Technion

== S ==
- Jorge Serrano – former president of Guatemala
- Shigeo Shingo – creator of SMED (Single Minute Exchange of Die) technique and Poka-Yoke (fail-safe) devices
- William H. Swanson – President and CEO of Raytheon Co. (California Polytechnic State University, San Luis Obispo)

== T ==
- Frederick Winslow Taylor – leader of the Efficiency Movement and a champion of standardisation and division of tasks
- Henry R. Towne – American mechanical engineer and businessman, known as an early systematizer of management
- John Tregoning (1840s–1920s) – American mechanical engineer; wrote the first books on factory management
- Laura Tremosa – first Catalan woman to qualify as an industrial engineer

== W ==
- Edward Whitacre, Jr. – Chairman of General Motors; former chairman and CEO of AT&T Inc. (Texas Tech University)
- Clinton Edgar Woods – American electrical and mechanical engineer, inventor, manufacturer of automobiles, and early management

== See also ==
- Institute of Industrial and Systems Engineers
