= IMD =

Imd or IMD may refer to:

== As a word ==
- Imd, a giantess in Norse mythology, one of the nine Mothers of Heimdall

== As an initialism ==
=== Institution or location ===
- India Meteorological Department, the Indian government agency for meteorology and seismology
- Indian Medical Department, the name of the medical department of the Indian army in 19th-20th century
- Interactive Media Division, a division of the School of Cinematic Art, the University of Southern California, Los Angeles, California, USA
- International Institute for Management Development (IMD), a business school located in Lausanne, Switzerland
- International MTM Directorate, a federation of national MTM (methods-time measurement) associations
- Internationales Musikinstitut Darmstadt, the organization responsible for the Darmstädter Ferienkurse

=== Medicine ===
- Invasive meningococcal disease
- Immune-mediated disease, any immune disorder or any disease secondary to immune responses
- Inherited metabolic disorder, an inborn error of metabolism from inherited mutation (as opposed to one from de novo mutation)
- Immunomodulatory drug (immunomodulator), a drug that adjusts immune function (Immunotherapy § Immunomodulators)
- Immunodeficiency, weakness of the immune system
- Immune-mediated diabetes, any type of diabetes with immune responses as a major causative factor
- Immunizing dose, the dose sufficient to immunize (and IMD_{50} is the median value)
- The Immune deficiency pathway (Imd pathway) of insects

=== Technology ===
- Indigo Magic Desktop, the default Desktop Environment for IRIX (a UNIX variant by Silicon Graphics), in versions 5.1–6.4
- Insulation monitoring device, a protection device or circuit in electric systems
- Intermodulation distortion, the result of two (or more) signals of different frequencies being mixed together in a signal processing path, forming additional, unwanted signals

=== Other ===
- Illinois Medical District, a special-use zoning district on the Near West Side of Chicago, Illinois, USA
- Index of Multiple Deprivation
- International Management District in Greater Houston
- International Media Distribution
- International Men's Day, an international event
- International Museum Day, a celebration that is held each year on or about 18 May
- IMDb, Internet Movie Database
