= Maynard operation sequence technique =

Predetermined motion time system

Maynard operation sequence technique (MOST) is a predetermined motion time system that is used primarily in industrial settings to set the standard time in which a worker should perform a task. To calculate this, a task is broken down into individual motion elements, and each is assigned a numerical time value in units known as time measurement units, or TMUs, where 100,000 TMUs is equivalent to one hour. All the motion element times are then added together and any allowances are added, and the result is the standard time. It is more common in Asia whereas the original and more sophisticated Methods Time Measurement technique, better known as MTM, is a global standard.

The most commonly used form of MOST is BasicMOST, which was released in Sweden in 1972 and in the United States in 1974. Two other variations were released in 1980, called MiniMOST and MaxiMOST. The difference between the three is their level of focus—the motions recorded in BasicMOST are on the level of tens of TMUs, while MiniMOST uses individual TMUs and MaxiMOST uses hundreds of TMUs. This allows for a variety of applications—MiniMOST is commonly used for short (less than about a minute), repetitive cycles, and MaxiMOST for longer (more than several minutes), non-repetitive operations. BasicMost is in the position between them, and can be used accurately for operations ranging from less than a minute to about ten minutes.

Another variation of MOST is known as AdminMOST. Originally developed and released under the name ClericalMOST in the 1970s, it was recently updated to include modern administrative tasks and renamed. It is on the same level of focus as BasicMOST.

Up until 16bit programs stopped working with Windows, it was possible to use AutoMOST. AutoMOST was a knowledge based system employing decision trees. Developers created logic trees. These trees could then be used by non IE trained operators to generate Standard Times. The user answered a series of logic questions to route the logic and made inputs (number of parts fitted etc.). As they made their way through the tree, based on their route and inputs, AutoMOST would be gathering sub operation data to collate into the final time for the activity being measured. AutoMOST was able to pull in sub operation data from any of the base versions of MOST (Mini, Maxi or Basic)
