= Muther =

Muther is a surname. Notable people with the surname include:

- Richard Muther (1860–1909), German critic and art historian
- Richard Muther (1913–2014), American industrial engineer
- Rick Muther (1935–1995), American racing driver
