= Indian Institute of Aeronautical Engineering =

The Indian Institute of Aeronautical Engineering is a college of engineering at Dehradun, Uttarakhand, northern India.

It was founded in 1992 at 15/1, Kalidas Road, Dehradun. In 1995 it moved to 179 Kalidas Road, and in 2006 relocated near Jolly Grant Airport. The site has class rooms and hostels with all aircraft training facilities.

The institute was founded by Mr. Mahendra Kumar, a Chartered Engineer and life member of bodies including the Institution of Engineers (India), Aeronautical Society of India and Indian Institution of Industrial Engineering. His personal awards include the Glory of India Award. He is the Institute's Managing Director.

Indian Institute of Aeronautical Engineering trains its students by way of theoretical classes and practical training. The qualifications it offers include three-year and four-year Bachelor of Engineering degree courses; the first two years are taken on site, and the remainder at Perth College UHI in the United Kingdom.
