= Harold Bright Maynard =

American industrial engineer

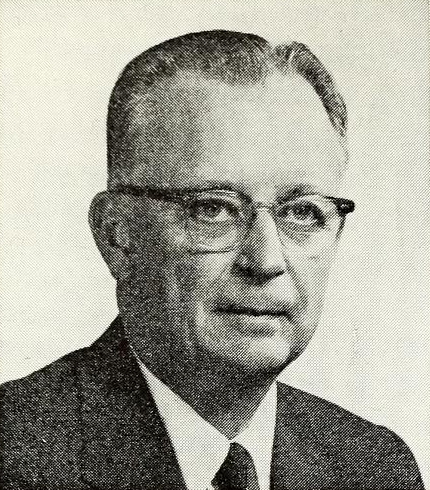
- Harold Bright Maynard
- Born: October 18, 1902; Northampton, Massachusetts
- Died: March 10, 1975
- Occupation: consulting engineer
- Employer(s): Westinghouse Electric Corporation; Methods Engineering Council; European Productivity to Mutual Security Agency

Harold Bright Maynard (Oct. 18, 1902 - Mar. 10, 1975) was an American industrial engineer, consulting engineer at the Methods Engineering Council, and management author. He is known as the "Broadway counsel for industries, railroads, state governments" and as recipient of the Henry Laurence Gantt Medal in 1964.

== Life and work ==
Maynard was born in 1902 in Northampton, Massachusetts to William Clement Maynard and Edith Lucia (Clark) Maynard. He attended the Protestant Episcopal Academy in Philadelphia, where he graduated in 1919. In 1923 he obtained his M.Sc. in mechanical engineering at Cornell University.

After his graduation in 1923 he started as a graduate student in the production steam division of Westinghouse Electric Corporation in Pittsburgh, where he was employed until 1929. From 1929 to 1934 he studied industrial problems in the U.S. and in Europe. In 1934 he founded the consulting firm Methods Engineering Council in Pittsburgh with Maynard as president. One of his early associates was Richard Muther.

With Methods Engineering Council Maynard consulted for industries, railroads and state governments. In 1944 he was also expert consultant to the secretary of war, and in 1952 participated in the Advisory Group on European Productivity to Mutual Security Agency.

In the year 1946-1947 Maynard served as president of the Society for Advancement of Management as successor of Raymond R. Zimmerman, and was succeeded by William L. McGrath.

In 1946 Maynard was awarded the Gilbreth Medal, which had been established in honour of Frank and Lillian Gilbreth. In 1954 he received the Wallace Clark Award, and in 1964 the annual Henry Laurence Gantt Medal by the American Management Association and the ASME.

== See also ==
- Maynard Operation Sequence Technique (MOST)
- Methods-time measurement

== Selected publications ==
- Maynard, Harold Bright, and Gustave James Stegemerten. Guide to methods improvement. McGraw-Hill Book Company, Incorporated, 1944.
- Maynard, Harold Bright. Industrial engineering handbook. 1956.
- Maynard, Harold Bright, ed. Effective Foremanship. McGraw-Hill book Company, Incorporated, 1941.
- Maynard, Harold B. ed. Top management handbook, New York,: MaGraw-Hill, 1960.
- Maynard, Harold Bright (ed.). Handbook of Business Administration. McGraw-Hill Book Company, 1967.
- Maynard, Harold Bright. Handbook of modern manufacturing management. Vol. 1. McGraw-Hill, 1970.

Articles, a selection

- Lowry, Stewart McKinley, Harold Bright Maynard, and Gustave James Stegemerten. "Time and motion study and formulas for wage incentives." (1940).
