= PMTS =

PMTS may refer to:

- Paramount Television Service
- Predetermined motion time system
