= Richard Muther =

Richard Muther may refer to:

- Richard Muther (art historian) (1860–1909), German critic and historian of art
- Richard Muther (industrial engineer) (1913–2014), American consulting engineer
- Rick Muther (1935–1995), racecar driver
