= Time and motion study =

Business efficiency technique

Original Films of Frank B. Gilbreth (Part I)

A time and motion study (or time–motion study) is a business efficiency technique combining the time study work of Frederick Winslow Taylor with the motion study work of Frank and Lillian Gilbreth (the same couple as is best known through the biographical 1950 film and book Cheaper by the Dozen). It is a major part of scientific management (Taylorism). After its first introduction, time study developed in the direction of establishing standard times, while motion study evolved into a technique for improving work methods. The two techniques became integrated and refined into a widely accepted method applicable to the improvement and upgrading of work systems. This integrated approach to work system improvement is known as methods engineering and it is applied today to industrial as well as service organizations, including banks, schools and hospitals.

== Time studies ==
Time study is a direct and continuous observation of a task, using a timekeeping device (e.g., decimal minute stopwatch, computer-assisted electronic stopwatch, and videotape camera) to record the time taken to accomplish a task. It is often used if at least one of the following applies:

- There are repetitive work cycles of short to long duration.
- A wide variety of dissimilar work is performed.
- Process control elements constitute a part of the cycle.

The Industrial Engineering Terminology Standard defines time study as "a work measurement technique consisting of careful time measurement of the task with a time measuring instrument, adjusted for any observed variance from normal effort or pace and to allow adequate time for such items as foreign elements, unavoidable or machine delays, rest to overcome fatigue, and personal needs."

The systems of time and motion studies are frequently assumed to be interchangeable terms that are descriptive of equivalent theories. However, the underlying principles and the rationale for the establishment of each respective method are dissimilar, despite originating within the same school of thought.

The application of science to business problems and the use of time-study methods in standard setting and the planning of work were pioneered by Frederick Winslow Taylor. Taylor liaised with factory managers and from the success of these discussions wrote several papers proposing the use of wage-contingent performance standards based on scientific time study. At the most basic level time studies involved breaking down each job into component parts, timing each part and rearranging the parts into the most efficient method of working. By counting and calculating, Taylor wanted to transform management, which was essentially an oral tradition, into a set of calculated and written techniques.

Taylor and his colleagues placed emphasis on the content of a fair day's work and sought to maximize productivity irrespective of the physiological cost to the worker. For example, Taylor thought unproductive time usage (soldiering) to be the deliberate attempt of workers to promote their best interests and to keep employers ignorant of how fast work could be carried out. This instrumental view of human behavior by Taylor prepared the path for human relations to supersede scientific management in terms of literary success and managerial application.

=== Direct time study procedure ===
Following is the procedure developed by Mikell Groover for a direct time study:

1. Define and document the standard method.
2. Divide the task into work elements.
  These first two steps are conducted prior to the actual timing. They familiarize the analyst with the task and allow the analyst to attempt to improve the work procedure before defining the standard time.
3. Time the work elements to obtain the observed time for the task.
4. Evaluate the worker's pace relative to standard performance (performance rating), to determine the normal time.
  Note that steps 3 and 4 are accomplished simultaneously. During these steps, several different work cycles are timed, and each cycle performance is rated independently. Finally, the values collected at these steps are averaged to get the normalized time.
5. Apply an allowance to the normal time to compute the standard time. The allowance factors that are needed in the work are then added to compute the standard time for the task.

=== Conducting time studies ===
According to good practice guidelines for production studies a comprehensive time study consists of:

1. Study goal set
2. Experimental design;
3. Time data collection;
4. Data analysis;
5. Reporting.

Easy analysis of working areas

The collection of time data can be done in several ways, depending on study goal and environmental conditions. Time and motion data can be captured with a common stopwatch, a handheld computer or a video recorder. There are a number of dedicated software packages used to turn a palmtop or a handheld PC into a time study device. As an alternative, time and motion data can be collected automatically from the memory of computer-control machines (i.e. automated time studies).

=== Criticisms ===
In response to Taylor's time studies and view of human nature, many strong criticisms and reactions were recorded. Unions, for example, regarded time study as a disguised tool of management designed to standardize and intensify the pace of production. Similarly, individuals such as Gilbreth (1909), Cadbury and Marshall heavily criticized Taylor and pervaded his work with subjectivity. For example, Cadbury in reply to Thompson stated that under scientific management employee skills and initiatives are passed from the individual to management, a view reiterated by Nyland. In addition, Taylor's critics condemned the lack of scientific substance in his time studies, in the sense that they relied heavily on individual interpretations of what workers actually do. However, the value in rationalizing production is indisputable and supported by academics such as Gantt, Ford and Munsterberg, and Taylor society members Mr C.G. Renold, Mr W.H. Jackson and Mr C.B. Thompson. Proper time studies are based on repeated observation, so that motions performed on the same part differently by one or many workers can be recorded, to determine those values that are truly repetitive and measurable.

== Motion studies ==
In contrast to, and motivated by, Taylor's time study methods, the Gilbreths proposed a technical language, allowing for the analysis of the labor process in a scientific context. The Gilbreths made use of scientific insights to develop a study method based upon the analysis of "work motions", consisting in part of filming the details of a worker's activities and their body posture while recording the time. The films served two main purposes. One was the visual record of how work had been done, emphasizing areas for improvement. Secondly, the films also served the purpose of training workers about the best way to perform their work. This method allowed the Gilbreths to build on the best elements of these workflows and to create a standardized best practice.

== Taylor vs. Gilbreths ==
Although for Taylor, motion studies remained subordinate to time studies, the attention he paid to the motion study technique demonstrated the seriousness with which he considered the Gilbreths' method. The split with Taylor in 1914, on the basis of attitudes to workers, meant the Gilbreths had to argue contrary to the trade unionists, government commissions and Robert F. Hoxie who believed scientific management was unstoppable. The Gilbreths were charged with the task of proving that motion study particularly, and scientific management generally, increased industrial output in ways which improved and did not detract from workers' mental and physical strength. This was no simple task given the propaganda fuelling the Hoxie report and the consequent union opposition to scientific management. In addition, the Gilbreths credibility and academic success continued to be hampered by Taylor who held the view that motion studies were nothing more than a continuation of his work.

Both Taylor and the Gilbreths continue to be criticized for their respective work, but it should be remembered that they were writing at a time of industrial reorganization and the emergence of large, complex organizations with new forms of technology. Furthermore, to equate scientific management merely with time and motion study and consequently labor control not only misconceives the scope of scientific management but also misinterprets Taylor's incentives for proposing a different style of managerial thought.

== Health care time and motion study ==
A health care time and motion study is used to research and track the efficiency and quality of health care workers. In the case of nurses, numerous programs have been initiated to increase the percent of a shift nurses spend providing direct care to patients. Prior to interventions nurses were found to spend ~20% of their time doing direct care. After focused intervention, some hospitals doubled that number, with some even exceeding 70% of shift time with patients, resulting in reduced errors, codes, and falls.

=== Methods ===
- External observer: Someone visually follows the person being observed, either contemporaneously or via video recording. This method presents additional expense as it usually requires a 1 to 1 ratio of research time to subject time. An advantage is the data can be more consistent, complete, and accurate than with self-reporting.
- Self-reporting: Self-reported studies require the target to record time and activity data. This can be done contemporaneously by having subjects stop and start a timer when completing a task, through work sampling where the subject records what they are doing at determined or random intervals, or by having the subject journal activities at the end of the day. Self-reporting introduces errors that may not be present through other methods, including errors in temporal perception and memory, interruptions in work to record activities, as well as the motivation to manipulate the data.
- Automation: Motion can be tracked with GPS. Documentation activities can be tracked through monitoring software embedded in the applications used to create documentation. Badge scans can also create a log of activity.

== See also ==
- Ergonomics
- Human factors
- Methods-time measurement
- Memo motion
- Predetermined motion time system
- Standard time
- Industrial engineering
- Evolutionary economics
