= Engineering statistics =

Analysis of data by combining engineering and statistics

Engineering statistics combines engineering and statistics using scientific methods for analyzing data. Engineering statistics involves data concerning manufacturing processes such as: component dimensions, tolerances, type of material, and fabrication process control. There are many methods used in engineering analysis and they are often displayed as histograms to give a visual of the data as opposed to being just numerical. Examples of methods are:

1. Design of Experiments (DOE) is a methodology for formulating scientific and engineering problems using statistical models. The protocol specifies a randomization procedure for the experiment and specifies the primary data-analysis, particularly in hypothesis testing. In a secondary analysis, the statistical analyst further examines the data to suggest other questions and to help plan future experiments. In engineering applications, the goal is often to optimize a process or product, rather than to subject a scientific hypothesis to test of its predictive adequacy. The use of optimal (or near optimal) designs reduces the cost of experimentation.
2. Quality control and process control use statistics as a tool to manage conformance to specifications of manufacturing processes and their products.
3. Time and methods engineering use statistics to study repetitive operations in manufacturing in order to set standards and find optimum (in some sense) manufacturing procedures.
4. Reliability engineering which measures the ability of a system to perform for its intended function (and time) and has tools for improving performance.
5. Probabilistic design involving the use of probability in product and system design
6. System identification uses statistical methods to build mathematical models of dynamical systems from measured data. System identification also includes the optimal design of experiments for efficiently generating informative data for fitting such models.

== History ==
Engineering statistics dates back to 1000 B.C. when the Abacus was developed as means to calculate numerical data. In the 1600s, the development of information processing to systematically analyze and process data began. In 1654, the Slide Rule technique was developed by Robert Bissaker for advanced data calculations. In 1833, a British mathematician named Charles Babbage designed the idea of an automatic computer which inspired developers at Harvard University and IBM to design the first mechanical automatic-sequence-controlled calculator called MARK I. The integration of computers and calculators into the industry brought about a more efficient means of analyzing data and the beginning of engineering statistics.

== Examples ==
=== Factorial Experimental Design ===
A factorial experiment is one where, contrary to the standard experimental philosophy of changing only one independent variable and holding everything else constant, multiple independent variables are tested at the same time. With this design, statistical engineers can see both the direct effects of one independent variable (main effect), as well as potential interaction effects that arise when multiple independent variables provide a different result when together than either would on its own.

=== Six Sigma ===
Six Sigma is a set of techniques to improve the reliability of a manufacturing process. Ideally, all products will have the exact same specifications equivalent to what was desired, but countless imperfections of real-world manufacturing makes this impossible. The as-built specifications of a product are assumed to be centered around a mean, with each individual product deviating some amount away from that mean in a normal distribution. The goal of Six Sigma is to ensure that the acceptable specification limits are six standard deviations away from the mean of the distribution; in other words, that each step of the manufacturing process has at most a 0.00034% chance of producing a defect.
