= Manny Lawson =

American football player (born 1984)

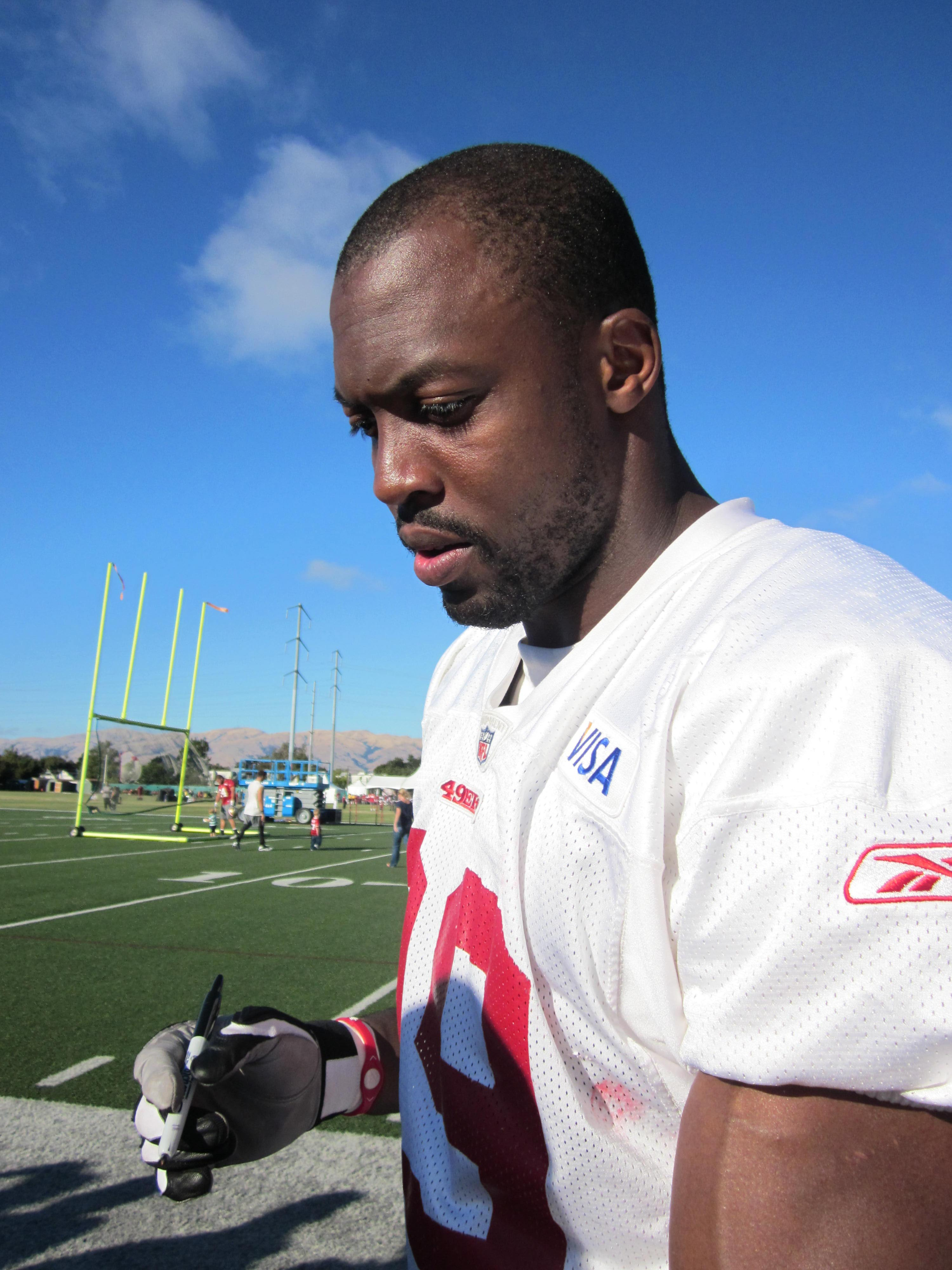
- Lawson with the San Francisco 49ers in 2010

No. 99, 50, 91
- Position: Linebacker

Personal information
- Born: July 3, 1984 (age 42); Goldsboro, North Carolina, U.S.
- Listed height: 6 ft 5 in (1.96 m)
- Listed weight: 240 lb (109 kg)

Career information
- High school: Eastern Wayne (Goldsboro, North Carolina)
- College: NC State (2002–2005)
- NFL draft: 2006: 1st round, 22nd overall pick

Career history
- San Francisco 49ers (2006–2010); Cincinnati Bengals (2011–2012); Buffalo Bills (2013–2015)

Awards and highlights
- First-team All-ACC (2005); Second-team All-ACC (2004)

Career NFL statistics
- Total tackles: 471
- Sacks: 24.5
- Forced fumbles: 8
- Fumble recoveries: 6
- Interceptions: 4
- Defensive touchdowns: 1
- Stats at Pro Football Reference

Manny Lawson (born July 3, 1984) is an American former professional football player who was a linebacker in the National Football League (NFL). He played college football for the NC State Wolfpack, and was selected by the San Francisco 49ers in the first round of the 2006 NFL draft. Lawson also played for the Cincinnati Bengals and Buffalo Bills.

== Early life ==
His father, Donald P. Lawson, was in the Air Force and stationed at Offutt Air Force Base near Omaha, Nebraska when Manny was born. Lawson excelled in football as well as basketball in his middle school years. He also attended Spring Creek Elementary School in Seven Springs, North Carolina.

Lawson attended Eastern Wayne High School in Goldsboro, North Carolina. Super Prep rated Lawson as one of the Top 25 players (#21) in the state of North Carolina during his senior year. He recorded 54 tackles and 12 sacks on defense and also rushed for 456 yards on offense during his final season, picking up Conference Defensive Player of the Year honors. Also a track & field star, Lawson qualified for the state indoor track meet in four events: long jump (7.72m or 24'11"), triple jump (14.41m or 47'3"), 55-meter dash (6.76s), 200-meter dash (22.09s) and the 55-meter hurdles (7.72s).

== College career ==
In 2002, he played in every game as a reserve outside linebacker. He recorded 35 tackles (20 solos) with a stop for a 5-yard loss on 144 plays. He caused a fumble and deflected four passes. He led the nation with three blocked punts, and was the co-winner of the Pack's Most Valuable Specialist Award. Lawson competed with the Wolfpack track & field squad in the spring of 2003; in his first meet, he won the long jump and the triple jump in the Patriot Games. He posted the fastest time in the 60-meter hurdles (indoors) for NC State that season (8.55s). He earned the Most Dominant Award for defense after spring workouts in 2003.

In 2003, he played in every game as an outside linebacker, starting against Texas Tech and Georgia Tech on the strong-side. After the regular season, he shifted to right defensive end and started there against Kansas in the Tangerine Bowl. He recorded 53 tackles (33 solos) with three sacks, seven stops for losses of 29 yards and three pressures. He caused two fumbles and recovered another. He blocked two punts and had five pass deflections. Lawson competed on the track & field squad during the winter and spring, winning the ACC title in the indoor long jump with a mark of 7.40 meters (24'3"). He finished second in that event outdoors with a leap of 7.33 meters (24'0.5"), he finished seventh in the outdoor triple jump (14.90m or 48'10.75"), fourth in the 60-meter hurdles (8.41s) and fourth with the 4 × 100 meter relay with a time of 41.25 seconds. He was named the Wolfpack's Special Teams Player of the Year and Most Improved Defensive Lineman following 2004 spring drills, he also earned the Defensive Leadership Award.

In 2004, he made Second-team All-ACC performer after ranking sixth in the conference with seven sacks for 55 yards. He ranked third on the team with a dozen stops for losses of 74 yards and second with sixteen quarterback pressures. He registered 50 tackles (39 solos) with a pair of fumble recoveries and a forced fumble. He deflected four passes and blocked a punt in his first season as a starter, lining up at right defensive end in every game. He was a co-recipient of the 2004 Cary Brewbaker Award, given to the most valuable defensive lineman. He was named the strength index champion for the Wolfpack linemen.

In 2005, Lawson made All-Atlantic Coast Conference first-team selection by The NFL Draft Report. He started every game, except against Wake Forest, at right defensive end. He participated in 617 plays during the regular season. He recorded a career-high 58 tackles (33 solos), adding three solo hits on special teams. He registered 21 pressures with four pass deflections and a blocked kick. He ranked second in the conference and twelfth in the nation with 10.5 sacks for minus 83 yards. He ranked fourth in the conference, third on the team and 14th in the nation with 19.5 stops for losses of 112 yards

== Professional career ==
Pre-draft measurables
Height	Weight	Arm length	Hand span	40-yard dash	10-yard split	20-yard split	20-yard shuttle	Three-cone drill	Vertical jump	Broad jump	Bench press	Wonderlic
6 ft 5 3/8 in (1.97 m)	241 lb (109 kg)	33 3/4 in (0.86 m)	9 7/8 in (0.25 m)	4.44 s	1.53 s	2.61 s	4.18 s	6.90 s	39.5 in (1.00 m)	10 ft 4 in (3.15 m)	23 reps	43
All values from NFL Combine

=== San Francisco 49ers ===
The San Francisco 49ers selected Lawson in the first round of the 2006 NFL draft with the intention that he could bring pressure off the edges as the 49ers defense transitioned from a 4–3 defense to a 3–4. Although Lawson played defensive end in college, the 49ers felt that he had the athletic ability to change position to linebacker. Lawson impressed opposing teams with his athleticism and speed on the field. He showed that he could play linebacker at the next level consistently, making plays from sideline to sideline. He finished the year with 2.5 sacks, one interception, one blocked punt, and 2 fumble recoveries.

Lawson was voted Week 2 Rookie of the Week for his performance against the St. Louis Rams by voters on the NFL website. In the game, he recorded three tackles, two sacks, and two quarterback pressures.

In 2007, he started off the season well. He accrued 11 tackles in the first two contests, both tight victories, over Arizona and St.Louis. He had several good QB pressures but mainly was noted for his excellent coverage play, keeping both teams' tight ends fairly non-existent in the offense and letting the rest of the defense focus on stopping those teams' excellent wide receiver duos. Lawson tore his ACL during a practice preparing for a week 3 games against Pittsburgh, ending his season.

=== Cincinnati Bengals ===
On August 2, 2011, Lawson signed a one-year contract with the Cincinnati Bengals. On April 14, 2012, Lawson re-signed with the Bengals.

=== Buffalo Bills ===
On March 13, 2013, Lawson signed with the Buffalo Bills for 4 years worth up to $12 million. Under new defensive coordinator Mike Pettine Lawson switched from outside linebacker to defensive end in Pettine's 4–3 scheme He then changed back to outside linebacker for the 2015 season in coach Rex Ryan's 3–4 scheme.

In 2016, Lawson was suspended one game for a violation of the league's personal conduct policy due to a domestic situation during the 2015 season, and he appealed the suspension. On September 2, 2016, Lawson was released by the Bills.

== NFL statistics ==
Year	Team	GP	COMB	TOTAL	AST	SACK	FF	FR	FR YDS	INT	IR YDS	AVG IR	LNG	TD	PD
2006	SF	16	57	47	10	2.5	0	2	0	1	0	0	0	0	2
2007	SF	2	11	8	3	0.0	0	0	0	0	0	0	0	0	1
2008	SF	14	45	33	12	3.0	1	1	0	0	0	0	0	0	3
2009	SF	16	68	51	17	6.5	3	1	0	0	0	0	0	0	2
2010	SF	16	59	48	11	2.5	2	1	5	1	0	0	0	0	6
2011	CIN	16	52	31	21	1.5	0	0	0	0	0	0	0	0	4
2012	CIN	16	39	30	9	2.0	1	0	0	0	0	0	0	0	1
2013	BUF	15	73	52	21	4.0	1	1	1	1	0	0	0	0	1
2014	BUF	16	20	16	4	1.5	0	0	0	0	0	0	0	0	2
Career		127	424	316	108	23.5	8	6	0	3	0	0	0	0	22

== See also ==
- List of North Carolina State University people
- List of industrial engineers
