= Standard time (manufacturing) =

Industrial engineering concept

In industrial engineering, the standard time is the time required by an average skilled operator, working at a normal pace, to perform a specified task using a prescribed method. It includes appropriate allowances to allow the person to recover from fatigue and, where necessary, an additional allowance to cover contingent elements which may occur but have not been observed.

Standard time = normal time + allowance

Where;

Normal time = average time × rating factor (take rating factor between 1.1 and 1.2)

== Usage of the standard time ==
Time times for all operations are known.

- Staffing (or workforce planning): the number of workers required cannot accurately be determined unless the time required to process the existing work is known.
- Line balancing (or production leveling): the correct number of workstations for optimum work flow depends on the processing time, or standard, at each workstation.
- Materials requirement planning (MRP): MRP systems cannot operate properly without accurate work standards.
- System simulation: simulation models cannot accurately simulate operation unless times for all operations are known.
- Wage payment: comparing expected performance with actual performance requires the use of work standards.
- Cost accounting: work standards are necessary for determining not only the labor component of costs, but also the correct allocation of production costs to specific products.
- Employee evaluation: in order to assess whether individual employees are performing as well as they should, a performance standard is necessary against which to measure the level of performance.

== Techniques to establish a standard time ==
The standard time can be determined using the following techniques:

1. Time study
2. Predetermined motion time system aka PMTS or PTS
3. Standard data system
4. Work sampling

== Method of calculation ==
The Standard Time is the product of three factors:

1. Observed time: The time measured to complete the task.
2. Performance rating factor: The number pace the person is working at. 90% is working slower than normal, 110% is working faster than normal, 100% is normal. This factor is calculated by an experienced worker who is trained to observe and determine the rating.
3. Personal, fatigue, and delay (PFD) allowance.

The standard time can then be calculated by using:

$\text{Standard Time} = (\text{Observed Time})(\text{Rating Factor})(1+\text{PFD Allowance})$

== Citations ==
- Groover, M. P. (2007). Work systems: the methods, measurement and management of work, Prentice Hall, ISBN 978-0-13-140650-6
- Salvendy, G. (Ed.) (2001). Handbook of Industrial Engineering: Technology and Operations Management, third edition, John Wiley & Sons, Hoboken, NJ.
- Zandin, K. (Ed.) (2001). Maynard's Industrial Engineering Handbook, fifth edition, McGraw-Hill, New York, NY.
