= PFD allowance =

PFD allowance in work systems is the adjustment done to the normal time to obtain the standard time for the purpose of recovering the lost time due to personal needs, fatigue, and unavoidable delays. By providing a small increase to the normal time in each cycle, a worker can still be able to cover lost time and complete the work assigned to him or her.

== Allowance technique ==
There are two types of interruption: (1) interruption related to work (2) interruption not related to work. For example, a machine breakdown, rest break to overcome fatigue, and receiving instruction from the manager are the interruption related to work, but personal needs, lunch breaks, and personal telephone calls are interruptions not related to work. However, the two types of interruption are both essential for the worker because it is almost impossible to work continually during a regular shift.

=== Personal needs, fatigue, and unavoidable delays allowance ===
As an allowance, the standard time is calculated by dividing the normal time by 1 minus the PFD allowance:

  
    
      
        
          T
          
            std
          
        
        =
        
          T
          
            n
          
        
        
          /
        
        (
        1
        −
        
          A
          
            pfd
          
        
        )
      
    
    {\displaystyle T_{\text{std}}=T_{n}/(1-A_{\text{pfd}})}
  

- $T_\text{std}=$standard time.
- $T_n =$ normal time.
- $A_\text{pfd} =$ PFD allowance.

==== Personal needs ====
The personal needs allowance is the time that is associated with workers’ daily personal needs which include going to the restroom, phone calls, going to the water fountain, and similar interruptions of a personal nature. However, it is categorized as 5%, but it also depends on the work environment, e.g. in terms of discomfort and temperature.

==== Fatigue ====
The fatigue allowance is intended to cover the time that the worker should be given to overcome fatigue due to work related stress and conditions. There are three factors that cause fatigue: (1) physical factors like standing and use of force, (2) mental and cognitive factors like mental strain and eye strain, and (3) environmental and work factors like poor lighting, noise, and heat.

==== Unavoidable Delays ====
Unavoidable delays are categorized under unavoidable interruption that occurs at random times during the day in the workplace. They usually refer to work-related events like cleaning up at the end of the shift, and machine breakdowns or malfunctions. Unavoidable delays occur because of many random events at work stations.
