= Memo motion =

Tool of time and motion study using a camera

Memo motion or spaced-shot photography is a tool of time and motion study that analyzes long operations by using a camera. It was developed 1946 by Marvin E. Mundel at Purdue University.

Mundel published the method in 1947 with several studies in his textbook Systematic Motion and time study, showing the following advantages of Memo motion in regard to other forms of time and motion study:

1. Single operator repetition work
2. Aerea studies, the study of a group of men or machines
3. Team studies
4. Utilisation studies
5. Work measurement

It was used in the US to some extent, but rarely in Europe and other industrial countries due to difficulties procuring the required cameras.

Scottish motion study pioneer, Anne Gillespie Shaw, used Memo motion in a number of films commissioned from her company, The Anne Shaw Organisation, for commercial and public sector organisations.
