= William L. McGrath =

William Lynn McGrath
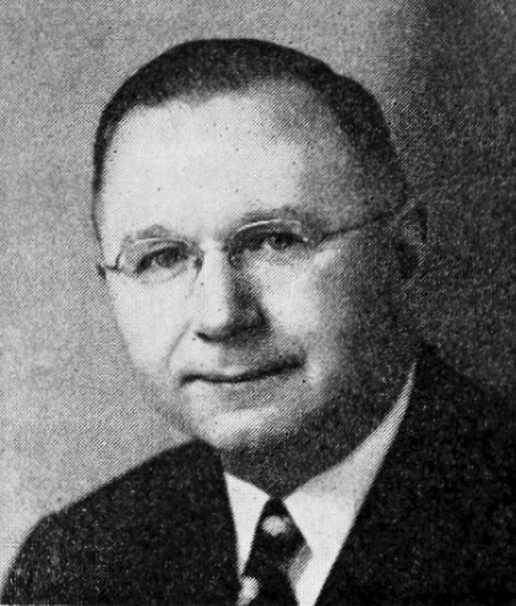
- William L. McGrath
- Born: May 1, 1894; Cincinnati, Ohio, United States
- Died: April 18, 1975 (aged 80); Hyde Park, Cincinnati
- Occupation: business executive
- Employer(s): Williamson Heater Company in Cincinnati, Ohio
- Notable credit(s): President Society for Advancement of Management, 1947-48
- Spouse: Elsie G. (Rademacher) McGrath

William Lynn McGrath (May 1, 1894 – April 18, 1975) was an American business executive, who was president of the Williamson Heater Company in Cincinnati, Ohio. He served as 8th president of the Society for Advancement of Management in the year 1947-1948.

== Biography ==
=== Youth, education and career at Williamson ===
McGrath was born in 1894 in Cincinnati, son of John Edward McGrath and Margaret May (Groub) McGrath. After the regular Cincinnati public schools, he started working in 1906 selling newspapers for The Post. In 1908, at the age of 14 he was Western Union messenger. In 1918, at the age of 24, he got married.

In 1920 McGrath joined the Williamson Company, a producer of heating equipment in Cincinnati, Ohio. In 1931 he was appointed executive vice president, and in 1943 he was elected president. In 1959 he became chairman of the board.

Under McGraths direction the Williamson Company had "diversified its product line to include cooling equipment... and had become a major supplier of containers for jet engines, missiles, and delicate electronic instrumentations."

=== Further career and honours ===
Later in his career, beside his work at the Williamson Company, McGrath had served as director of the Cincinnati Gas & Electric Company, now Cinergy; the Fifth Third Union Trust Company, now Fifth Third Bank; the Cambridge Tile Company; the Cincinnati Enquirer Incorporated, publisher of The Cincinnati Enquirer; and the American Tool Works Co. in Cincinnati.

From 1949 to 1952 McGrath served "as an industry adviser to the United States employer delegate to the annual June conferences of the International Labour Organization in Geneva, Switzerland. In 1954, and again in 1955, he served as the United States employer delegate to the conference, heading the American employer delegation. In 1954, he was elected for a three-year period as the United States employer representative on the governing body of that organization."

In the year 1947-1948 McGrath served as president of the Society for Advancement of Management as successor of Harold B. Maynard, and was succeeded by Charles C. James. He also served as president of the National Warm Air Heating and Air Conditioning Association. In 1974 McGrath was elected "Great Living Cincinnatians" by the Cincinnati Chamber of Commerce, where he had been elected director twice, in 1945 and in 1948.

=== Family ===
McGrath married Elsie G. Rademacher on June 1. 1918, and they had four children: Mary Margaret McGrath, Betty Mae McGrath, Robert L. McGrath, and Carol Ann McGrath.

== Selected publications ==
- William L McGrath. Management development programs tailor-made to meet company needs. 1952.
- William L McGrath. Markets make jobs. 1954.

Articles, a selection

- McGrath, W. L. "Problems existing in the ILO." Advanced Management 18 (1953): 9-12.
- McGrath, W. L. "The American Role In World Culture." Challenge (1954): 15-18.
- McGrath, William L. "Report to the Chamber of Commerce of the United States and the National Association of Manufacturers." Journal of the American Medical Association 164.3 (1957): 325-328.
- McGrath, William Lynn, "Top Management and the Personnel Activity," in: Top management handbook, Harold B. Maynard (ed.), New York: McGraw-Hill, 1960. p. 687-705
