= Indian Institution of Industrial Engineering =

Organization in Navi Mumbai, India

- IIIE Logo
- Established: 1957
- Chair: Dr. Amiya Kumar Behera
- President: Shri Rahul Sahai
- Location: Mumbai, Maharashtra, India
- Coordinates: 19.0120737°N 73.0350169°E
- Interactive map of Indian Institution of Industrial Engineering
- Website: www.iiie-india.com

The Indian Institution of Industrial Engineering (IIIE) is a non-profit organization and registered society for propagating the profession of industrial engineering in India. It was founded in 1957 and is a Registered Public Trust under the Bombay Public Trust Act, 1950. The headquarters is at Navi Mumbai. IIIE is a member organization of Engineering Council of India.

The IIIE has instituted many honors and awards for various achievements and contribution to the industrial engineering profession for individuals and Performance Excellence Awards for Organisations.

== National Council ==
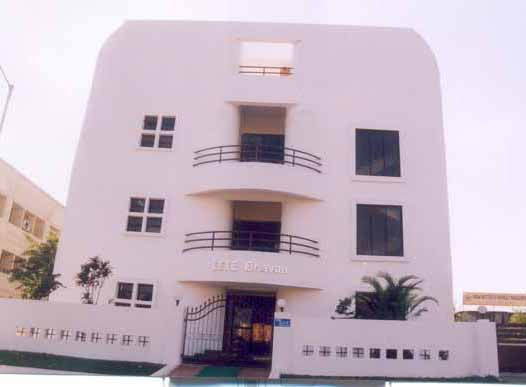
National Headquarters, Mumbai

A National Council consisting of twelve elected representative from among Corporate Members and six representatives from the Chapters is the Executive body of the Institution which is located in Navi Mumbai. The office bearers - A Chairman, two Vice-Chairmen, an Hon. Secretary, two Hon. Jt. Secretaries and an Hon. Treasurer for each year are elected by the National Council from among its members.

President of the Institution is nominated by the National Council each year.

== Membership ==
There are three classes of Corporate Membership, viz. Fellow, Member and Associate Member. Other classes of membership are : (i) Honorary Membership conferred by the National Council in recognition of outstanding services in the fields of Industrial Engineering and Management Sciences (ii) Affiliate (iii) Graduate (iv) Student and (v) Institutional Membership.

A member can join seminars, workshops, training programs, special lectures, industry visits and other professional activities of Institution.

Fellows, Members, Associate Members and Graduate Members of the Institution shall be permitted to affix the appropriate symbols as given below to their names.

Fellow - (F.I.I.E), Member - (M.I.I.E), Associate Member - (A.M.I.I.E), Graduate Member - (Grad. I.I.E)

After Graduateship the student is entitled to use below title

ASSOCIATE MEMBER OF INSTITUTE OF INDUSTRIAL ENGINEERING (A.M.I.I.E)

This is equal to B.E (Bachelor's of Engineering), B.Tech (Bachelor's of Technology) and A.M.I.E (Associate member of Institute of Engineering)

== Chapters ==
The Institution has Thirty Two chapters, distributed all over India, at Aurangabad, Allahabad, Bangalore, Baroda, Bhilai, Bhopal, Kolkata, Kozhikode, Chennai, Cochin, Coimbatore, Orissa, Durgapur, Hyderabad, Jamshedpur, Kanpur, Lucknow, Mumbai, Belapur, Nagpur, New Delhi, Pune, Ranchi, Rourkela, Tiruchirappalli, Baroda, Trivandrum, Visakhapatnam, Udaipur and Goa.

== Student chapters ==
The Institution has two recognized active students chapters in India. Both are recognized and function under their respective home chapter.

== Journal ==
The Institution brings out a monthly Journal entitled "Industrial Engineering Journal".It publishes papers and articles relating to application of industrial engineering and management techniques, including research work.

== Examination ==
The Institution conducts Graduateship Examination as external Examination for enabling candidates to qualify for GRADUATE MEMBERSHIP of the institution. The graduateship examination conducted by the institution (AMIIE) is recognized by the Government of India as equivalent to bachelor's degree in industrial engineering from any recognized university.

IIIE Graduates are eligible for appearing the Graduate Aptitude Test in Engineering (GATE) conducted by IITs and IISc.

The Examinations are open only for the student Members of the Institution and whose membership continues to remain Valid.

The requirements for eligibility to student Membership of the Institution:

Person should not be less than 18 years of age and should possess one of the following qualifications:

1) A pass in the Higher Secondary (XII Standard) Examination under the 10 + 2 + 3 Scheme of Education, of a Statutory Board of Higher Secondary Education, the Intermediate Examination, recognized as equivalent thereto and has at least two years working experience in an organisation.

2) Completed and passed first two years of regular degree course in Engineering / Technology.

3) A Graduate in Science stream only and has at least one year working experience in an organisation.

4) A Diploma (3 yrs course) in Engineering/technology recognized by the concerned Director of Technical Education and at least one year working experience in an organisation. In case, a candidate has undergone 1 year service training as a part of the course recognised by Board of Apprenticeship Training, Govt. of India. This will be counted as working experience.

5) A Degree in Engineering / Technology of a University in India or equivalent qualification recognised by the All India Council for Technical Education (AICTE) as equivalent.

== Scheme, subjects and recognition of the examination ==
The Examinations consist of three parts of written papers viz. the Preliminary, the Section A and the Section B. In addition, a project work has to be undertaken and Report submitted for acceptance. A student can appear for Section A papers only after completely passing the preliminary (or exempted from the preliminary). For appearance in a section, a student must have passed the previous section fully.

The Student will have to carry out an approved project in an organisation under a project guide. A Project Report has to be submitted to the Board of Examinations after the completion of the Project, for its acceptance.

The student is considered to have completed the Graduateship Examination only after his/her Project Report has been accepted by the Board of Examinations. Graduateship examination of Indian Institution of Industrial Engineering is recognised by Association of Indian Universities, Ministry of education & Social Welfare India at par with Bachelor's degree in Industrial Engineering of an Indian university. Indian Institution of Industrial Engineering.

== Awards and honors ==
The IIIE has instituted many Honors and Awards for various achievements and contributions to the Industrial Engineering profession for members, non-members, chapters and other bodies. All Honors and Awards are conferred by the IIIE National Council at its National Convention.

- Lillian Gilbreth Award - Awarded annually to the person making outstanding contributions to the profession of Industrial Engineering.
- Honorary Membership - Awarded to individual's professional achievements recognized nationally or internationally.
- Ramaswamy Cup - Donated by Mr. S. S. Rangnekar - The Cup is awarded annually to the person making outstanding contribution to the institution.
- H. K. Firodia Award - Donated by Mr. H. K. Firodia, Past President - Cash Award, a Medal and Certificate.
- Krish Pennathur Shield - Donated by Dr. K. Pennathur - The shield is awarded annually to the BEST CHAPTER of the year of its outstanding overall performance.
- Fellowship - Awarded to the Members in recognition of their outstanding contribution to the profession and the Institution.

== See also ==
- American Society for Engineering Education
- American Society for Quality
- Engineering management
- Ergonomics
- INFORMS
- Institute of Industrial Engineers
- List of industrial engineers
- List of production topics
- Management consulting
- Management science
- Methods engineering
- Operations management
- Operations research
- Plant layout study
- Quality assurance
- Reverse engineering
- Sales process engineering
- Statistical process control
- Supply chain
- System dynamics
- Systems engineering
- Value engineering
