= Karen Bursic =

American professor, industrial engineering

Karen Manning Bursic is an American industrial engineer who is a is professor and undergraduate program director in industrial engineering at the Swanson School of Engineering at University of Pittsburgh. She specializes in engineering economics and engineering management. She was elected a fellow of the American Society for Engineering Education in 2023.

Bursic earned a B.S. (1984) in industrial engineering, a M.S. (1987) in engineering management, and a Ph.D. (1990) in industrial engineering from the University of Pittsburgh. Her dissertation was titled, Factors Contributing to the Successful Use of Teams (and Benefits Gained from their Use) in Manufacturing Organizations. David I. Cleland was her doctoral advisor.
