= Methods-time measurement =

Procedures for analyzing work processes

Methods-Time Measurement (MTM) is a predetermined motion time system that is used primarily in industrial settings to analyze the methods used to perform any manual operation or task and, as a product of that analysis, to set the standard time in which a worker should complete that task.

MTM was released in 1948 and today exists in several variations, known as MTM-1, MTM-2, MTM-UAS, MTM-MEK and SAM-analysis. Some MTM standards are obsolete, including MTM-3 and MMMM (4M).

== History ==
Methods-Time Measurement is a predetermined motion time system that is used to analyze the work methods to perform any manual operation or task and, as a product of that analysis, to set the standard time in which a worker should complete that task.

MTM does not make use of a stopwatch or time study and therefore also negates the need for pace rating.

The basic MTM data was developed by H.B. Maynard, JL Schwab and GJ Stegemerten of the Methods Engineering Council during a consultancy assignment at the Westinghouse Brake and Signal Corporation, United States in the 1940s. This data and the application rules for the MTM system were refined, extended, defined, industrially tested and documented as a result of further work in later years.

In 1948, Maynard, Stegemerten and Schwab published the book “Methods-Time Measurement” giving full details of the development of the MTM system and its application rules. The use of Methods-Time Measurement MTM spread, first in the USA and then to other industrialized countries. In 1951 the USA / Canada MTM Association for Standards and Research was formed by MTM users. The system originators then assigned the MTM copyrights to the MTM Association. Other national MTM Associations were founded; and at a meeting in Paris in 1957, it was decided to form an International MTM Directorate (IMD) to co-ordinate the work of National Associations.

Other MTM based systems have since been developed. MTM-2, a second generation system, was developed under IMD auspices in 1965; MTM–3, a further simplification, was developed in 1970. The original MTM system is now commonly referred to as MTM-1. Other systems based on MTM have been developed for particular work areas by National Associations. The most recent development is MTM-UAS, created by a consortium from the German, Swiss and Austrian National Associations during the mid 1970s. In 1975 the Nordic MTM Association developed and launched MTM-SAM, the third generation of MTM technique.

In 2020 the IMD was terminated and dissolved, and the members split into two groups. The majority of the members (Germany, United States, Italy, Benelux, Brazil, Czechia, Slovakia, China, Hungary, Mexico, South Africa, Austria, Poland and United Kingdom) formed the One-MTM network, headquartered at the MTM ASSOCIATION e.V. in Hamburg, Germany. The minority members did not accept this organisation.

MTM Association e.V. is the copyright owner of the following MTM systems: MTM-1®, MTM-2®, MTM-HWD®, MTM-SD®, MTM-UAS® MTM-Logistics, MTM-MEK®, MTM-VI, EAWS®. One-MTM partners develop MTM products and services in the fields of training, consulting, software and research and ensure their uniform application and dissemination worldwide.

Nordic MTM Association is the copyright owner of the newest MTM based system: Sequence Based Activity and Method analysis. Created 1983 and reworked 2025. Only 3 days course is needed to get certicate. System works also in APP.

== Methodology ==
Films were taken using constant speed cameras, running at 16 frames per second, of the work performed by qualified workers on the shop floor at the Westinghouse Brake and Signal Corporation. Each sequence was rated during filming by three qualified Industrial Engineers. These ratings had to agree within a close band, otherwise the sequence was not used.

The rating, or Levelling, system used was the Westinghouse or LMS system – so called after its originators Lowry, Maynard and Stegemerten. This system considers four factors independently:

- Skill – Proficiency in following the given method
- Effort – The will to work
- Conditions – The general work surroundings
- Consistency – of performance

Each factor is assigned an alpha rating, e.g. “B-“, “C+”, “A”, etc. which has a numeric value which is applied later. This reduces the possibility of “clock rating” and ensures that all factors are considered in the composite rating. Appendix 1 shows the model for Causes of Difference in Output on which the LMS system is based.

Layout, distances, sizes of parts and tools and tolerances were accurately measured and recorded on the shop floor to complement the later analyses.

The films were then projected frame-by-frame and analysed and classified in to a predetermined format of Basic Motions. These Basic Motions were Reach, Grasp, Move, Position, Release, etc. A motion was taken to begin on the frame in which the hand first started performing the motion and was taken to end on the frame in which the motion was completed. This allowed a time for each recorded motion to be calculated in seconds, by means of a frame count, and then “levelled” to a common performance.

Plots of the levelled times for the various motions were drawn. Analysis determined the best definitions of limits of motions and their major, time-determining variables, and resulted in, more or less, the structure which the manual motions of MTM-1 have today. Later work, using Time Study, gave the table of Body Motions.

In 1949, Cornell University conducted an independent study of MTM for the American Society of Mechanical Engineers. It used camera speeds of 64fps. The MTM data was replicated within very close limits. Minor discrepancies revealed by the faster camera speeds have since been corrected in the MTM-1 data.

Detailed research conducted under the auspices of the USA / Canada MTM Association have resulted in minor changes to the data and the application rules and in a greater understanding of the nature of the motions. The last change was made to the detail of the Apply Pressure data in 1973.

Many contributions were developed in the area of MTM, more recently 2019-2020, a team from University of Pisa collaborated with an Italian company developed an automated system called Method Time Measurement 4.0 (MTM4.0) aligning with Industry 4.0 concepts and enabling technologies such as Industrial Internet of Things (IIoT) and Radio Frequency IDentification (RFID), the work of the team is published in International Journal of Productivity and Performance Management.

MTM is complementary to other Industrial Engineering charting analytical techniques; it does not replace them. It should be used after broader techniques have established the Necessity and Purpose, Place, Sequence, Person and Means of the tasks to be evaluated.

== Unit ==
The unit in which movements are measured for MTM is the TMU (time measurement unit): 1 TMU = 36 milliseconds; 1 hour = 100,000 TMU.
