= Diabetes (disambiguation) =

Diabetes usually refers to diabetes mellitus, a group of metabolic diseases characterized by sustained high blood sugar levels.

Diabetes may also refer to:

- Diabetes insipidus, a condition characterized by large amounts of dilute urine and increased thirst
- Diabetes (journal), a peer-reviewed scientific journal

== See also ==
- Glossary of diabetes
- Diabetes in cats
- Diabetes in dogs
- Equine metabolic syndrome
