= Leslie Benmark =

American industrial engineer

- Born: Leslie Ann Benmark
- Education: University of Tennessee (BS, MS); Vanderbilt University (PhD, 1976)
- Known for: First female president of IISE; ABET Engineering Accreditation
- Awards: National Academy of Engineering (1993); IISE Frank and Lillian Gilbreth Industrial Engineering Award (1993); University of Tennessee Distinguished Alumna (1988)
- Scientific career
- Fields: Industrial engineering, Systems engineering
- Workplaces: DuPont; University of Delaware (Adjunct)

Leslie Ann Benmark, née Freeman (born 1944) is an American industrial engineer known for her work in engineering education, specifically accreditation. In 1989, she became the first woman president of the Institute of Industrial Engineers (now IISE) since its founding in 1948.

== Early life and education ==
Benmark attended the University of Tennessee for her undergraduate education and graduated with a bachelor's degree in 1967. She stayed at that institution for her master's degree, which she earned in 1970. She moved to Vanderbilt University for her doctoral education, and received a Ph.D. in information systems in 1976. Benmark also earned a JD in 1984 from the University of Delaware.

== Career and research ==
Benmark began her career with a stint as a systems analyst at Monsanto Company from 1967–1968. She then moved to DuPont and had several different positions, including as a systems analyst and in management. While working towards her Ph.D. at Vanderbilt, Benmark was a computer science instructor there from 1973-1975; she was then the director of the university's women in engineering program until 1979. She is on the accreditation boards for engineering curricula in several countries, including Ireland and the United States.

== Honors and awards ==
Elected to the National Academy of Engineering in 1993, Benmark is a fellow of several professional societies and has won awards for her work:

- President, Accreditation Board for Engineering and Technology (ABET) (1990-1991)
- Member, National Academy of Engineering (1993)
- Board of Directors of Manufacturing Studies, National Science Foundation (1993)
- Linton E. Grinter Distinguished Service Award, ABET (1994)
- Fellow, Institute of Industrial Engineers
- Member, American Society for Engineering Education
- Industrial Engineering Advisory Board, Oak Ridge National Laboratory
