= International MTM Directorate =

The International MTM Directorate (IMD) is a Federation of National Methods-Time Measurement Associations. It was originally constituted in Paris on June 25, 1957, and was then reincorporated under the laws of Ohio on November 6, 1968. Membership in the International MTM Directorate is held by National associations acknowledged by IMD as representing MTM activities in their respective countries.

The general objective of the IMD and the National MTM Associations is to develop, spread and employ knowledge concerning man at work so as to improve his productivity, his job satisfaction and his working conditions. More specifically, the objectives of the IMD are to encourage close cooperation among all those interested in the study of man at work whether it is in research, training or field of application.

It published the MTM Journal of Methods-time Measurement.
