= Wage payment systems =

Wage Payment Systems are the different methods adopted by organizations by which they remunerate labour. There exist several systems of employee wage payment and incentives, which can be classified under the following names.

== Methods ==
Time Rate Systems

- Time Rate System: Under this system, the worker is paid by the hour, day, week, or month.
- High Wage plan: Under this plan a worker is paid a wage rate which is substantially higher than the rate prevailing in the area or in the industry. In return, he is expected to maintain a very high level of performance, both quantitative and qualitative.
- Measured day work : According to this method the hourly rate of the time worker consists of two parts, namely, fixed and variable. The fixed element is based on the nature of the job i.e. the rate for this part is fixed on the basis of job requirements. The variable portion varies for each worker depending upon his merit rating and the cost-of-living index.
- Differential time rate : According to this method, different hourly rates are fixed for different levels of efficiency.

Payment on Result

- Piece Work
  - Straight piecework system : The wages of the worker depend upon his output and rate of each unit of output; it is in fact independent of the time taken by him.
  - Differential piece work system: This system provide for higher rewards to more efficient workers. For different levels of output below and above the standard, different piece rates are applicable.
    - Taylor Differential Piece Work System
    - Merrick Differential Piece-rate System
- Combination of Time and Piece Work
  - Gantt task and bonus system: the system consists of paying a worker on time basis if he does not attain the standard and on piece basis (high rate) if he does.
  - Emerson's efficiency system: Under this system minimum time wages are guaranteed, but beyond a certain efficiency level, bonus in addition to minimum day wages is given.

Sharing systems

- Lay system. Peculiar to the early whaling ships. Each of the crew, from captain to cabin boy, got a fixed share, called a "lay" of the profits. The captain might get 10% of the profits, the cabin boy 1/250th.
- Sharecropping. A landowner allows a tenant to farm the land in return for a share of the crops produced on it.
- High level executive contracts. More info needed

== Living wage ==
Living wages are currently being debated in developed countries, with implications in recent industrial disasters such as the Bangladesh factory collapses.

Professor Doug Miller of Northumbria University, UK has proposed using Industrial Engineering techniques to determine living wages in his paper.
