= Jacob Rubinovitz =

Israeli engineer (born 1947)

- יעקב רובינוביץ
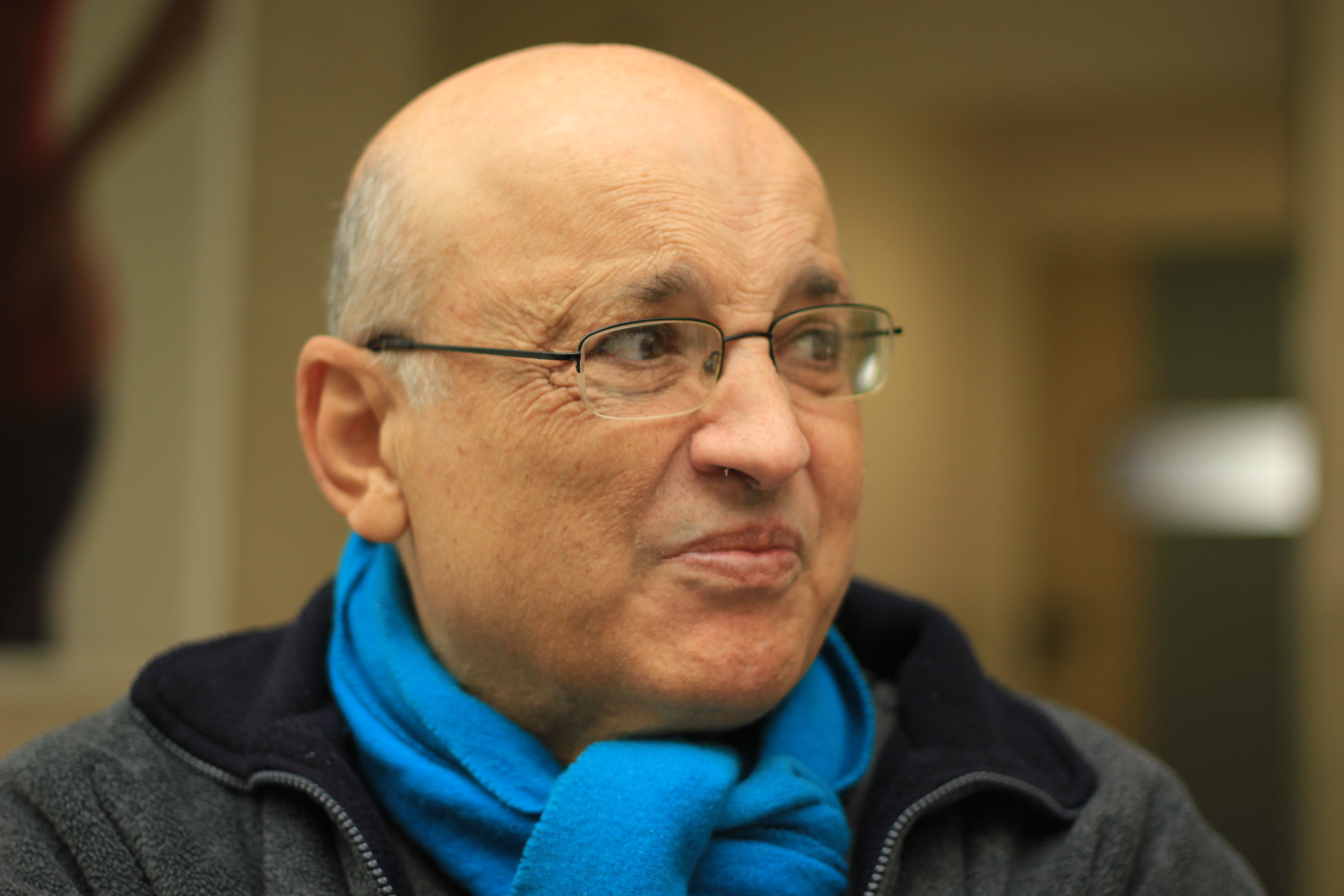
- Rubinovitz in 2012
- Born: September 6, 1947
- Died: April 27, 2018 (aged 70)
- Education: Technion, Penn State
- Known for: Robotics, industrial engineering
- Spouse: Nurit
- Scientific career
- Fields: CIM, robotics
- Doctoral advisor: Dr. Rick Wysk
- Other academic advisors: Ezey M. Dar-EL

Jacob Rubinovitz (Hebrew: יעקב רובינוביץ; September 6, 1947 – April 27, 2018) is an Israeli scientist. He was the head of the Laboratory for robotics and Computer Integrated Manufacturing (CIM) at the Technion.

== Biography ==
Rubinovitz was born in Łódź, Poland, 6 September 1947. In 1957 he moved to Israel, in Aliath Gomulka, in the movement of Jews from Poland to Israel which started in 1956, after the Polish October. He graduated from the Faculty of Industrial engineering and Management at the Technion. From 1969 to 1973 he was a senior systems analyst at Mamram and senior systems analyst at Control Data (Israel). He managed the industrial software team (1973–1983) and initially worked at Israel Aerospace Industries, installing in several countries the industrial software developed. Software called Mass was installed at Escom ( South Africa ) and used for maintenance of power plants.

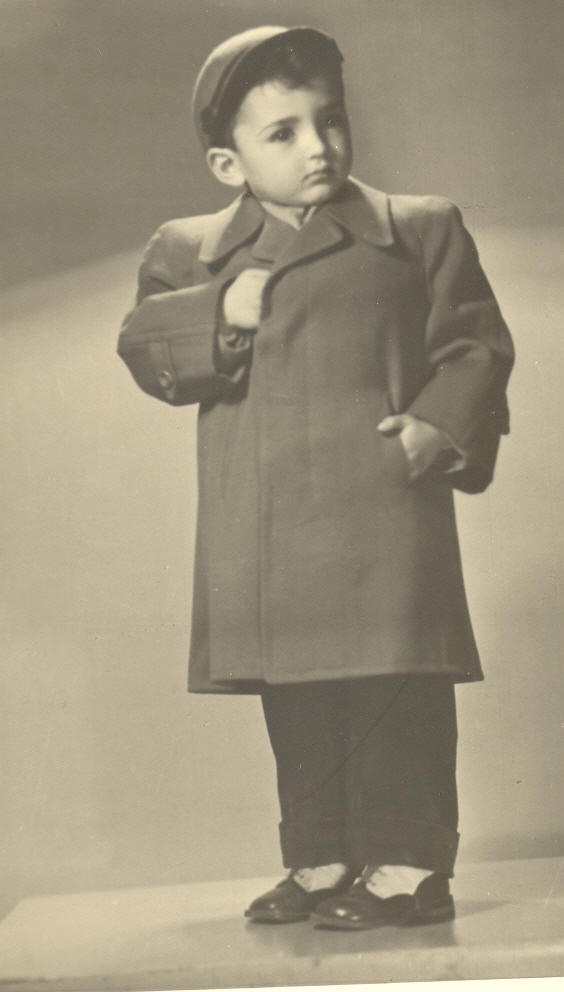
Rubinovitz as a child

In 1987, at the end of his doctoral studies at Pennsylvania State University, he served a year as a visiting professor at the Department of Industrial Engineering at Pennsylvania State University. In 1988, he returned to Israel and joined the Industrial Engineering & Management department at Technion. He created and led the Laboratory of Robotics and CIM at the Technion. Dr Hussein Naseraldin was his teaching assistant (currently he is a lecturer at the ORT Braude College of Engineering). While Rubinovitz was a faculty member of The Faculty of Industrial Engineering & Management, he had a joint activity with his teaching assistant in the field of active learning. This activity resulted from the vision of promoting active learning among students of production and management. From 2003 to 2004 he taught industrial engineering at the Tel Aviv University. In 2005 he went on early retirement from the Technion due to illness.

Rubinovitz published books and articles in his field. He was a member of the curriculum committee of Science and Technology Administration in the Ministry of Education in Israel

In March 2012 he was the guest of honor at the national conference of Industrial Engineering and Management in Israel - The 17th National Industrial Engineering And Management Conference.

Rubinovitz married Nurit, and he is father of three (Ofer Sagi and Michal Slonim) and a grandfather of four (Yuval, Harel, Naveh and Ilai Slonim). Previously he lived in Mishmar HaShiv'a.

== Writings ==
=== Books (or chapters in books) ===
- Shimon Y. Nof (editor), wrote Chapter 37 :CAD and Graphic Simulators/Emulators of Robotic Systems, Handbook of Industrial Robotics
- Bidanda and Cleland (editors) The Automated Factory Handbook Technology and Management
- (In Hebrew) Computer Integrated Manufacturing Systems: Introduction and content calculation, digital control
- (along with other scientists), including Z'eev Bonen Survey on the Penetration of Advanced Production Systems and Factory Automation into the Israeli Industry

=== Selected articles ===
- Design and Balancing of Robotic Assembly Lines
- Genetic Algorithm for the Robotic Assembly Plan Problem
- Task level off-line programming system for robotic arc welding – an overview. Journal of Manufacturing Systems, 7(4), 293–299.
- Off-line computer-aided path planning system for an arc-welding robot
- Heuristic algorithm for the generalized group technology problem
- Analysis of Robot Motion Performance and Implications to Economy Principles
- A genetic algorithm for robotic assembly line balancing
- Genetic algorithm for linear and cyclic assignment problem
- Using learning theory in assembly lines for new products
- A weighted approach for assembly line design with station paralleling and equipment selection
- RALB – A Heuristic Algorithm for Design and Balancing of Robotic Assembly Lines
