= Richard Muther (industrial engineer) =

Richard (Dick) Muther
- Born: November 20, 1913; Newton, Massachusetts
- Died: October 15, 2014 (aged 100)
- Other name: Mister Systematic
- Education: University of Wisconsin, B.S. and M.S. from the Massachusetts Institute of Technology
- Parent(s): Lorenz Francis Muther and Josephine (Ashleman) Muther
- Engineering career
- Discipline: Industrial engineering
- Practice name: Production management
- Employers: Methods Engineering Council, Richard Muther and Associates. Professor at MIT, Naval Postgraduate School, Robert College (Turkey), University of Missouri–Kansas City, ETH Zurich (Switzerland), and at the Royal Institute of Technology (Sweden)
- Significant design: The relationship chart (REL-CHART), the space-relationship diagram and the Mag Count method
- Significant advance: Techniques used in plant layout and material handling. Mass production method's studies
- Awards: ScD(hc) from Lund University (Sweden), Gilbreth Medal, Materials Handling Award (SAM), Engineering Citation Award (SME), Honor Award (IMMS), Reed-Apple Award (MHIA), and the Donald Francis Award

Richard Muther (November 20, 1913 – October 15, 2014) was an American consulting engineer, faculty member at MIT, and author. He developed fundamental techniques used in plant layout, material handling, and other aspects of industrial engineering. He was also known as "Mister Systematic".

== Biography ==
Muther was born 1913 in Newton, Massachusetts to Lorenz Francis Muther and Josephine (Ashleman) Muther. After attending the University of Wisconsin, he obtained his B.S. and M.S. from the Massachusetts Institute of Technology.

In his early career Muther worked for the Methods Engineering Council in Pittsburgh, the consulting firm of Harold Bright Maynard. In 1956 he founded his own consulting firm, Richard Muther and Associates, and worked as consulting engineer for organizations, such as Vendo in Kansas City, General Dynamics, Philips in the Netherlands, John Deere, and in the People's Republic of China for its Department of Energy.

In World War II Muther served in the US Navy as expediter and facilities planning officer. In 1944 he published his first book, entitled Production Line Technique, on mass production methods, based on studies at over 75 industrial plants.

Over the years Muther had taught at Massachusetts Institute of Technology, at the Naval Postgraduate School, and at Robert College in Turkey. He was visiting professor and instructor at the University of Missouri–Kansas City, and in Europe at the ETH Zurich in Switzerland, and at the Royal Institute of Technology in Sweden.

Muther received an honorary doctorate ScD(hc) from Lund University in Sweden. He also was awarded the Gilbreth Medal (outstanding contributions to Industrial Engineering) in 1962; the Materials Handling Award (SAM); the Engineering Citation Award (SME); the Honor Award (IMMS); the Reed-Apple Award (MHIA); and the Donald Francis Award (for outstanding contributions to international material handling.)

== Contributions to engineering ==
Muther was the original developer of relationship chart (REL-CHART) and its companion space-relationship diagram. This tool is the basis for many other techniques which are used to optimize the proximity of related functions and minimize unnecessary transportation in industrial facilities.

Muther also created the Mag Count method of measuring the difficulty of handling (transporting) any solid material prior to knowing how it will be moved. He developed the industry-standard color code used to classify industrial space and the related type-of-work symbols. Corresponding black-and-white hatch patterns based on the heraldic tincture code are also part of his methodology. He is considered the "Father of Systematic Planning".

== Selected publications ==
- Production Line Technique. New York: McGraw-Hill, 1944. ISBN 1114273023
- Practical Plant Layout. New York: McGraw-Hill, 1955. ISBN 0-933684-03-7
- Systematic Layout Planning (SLP). 1st edition. 1961; 2nd edition. Boston: Cahners Books, 1974, ISBN 9780843608144; Re-printed by Management & Industrial Research Publications, 1987, ISBN 978-0-933684-06-5.
- Systematic Handling Analysis (SHA) (Kansas City, Missouri: Management and Industrial research Publications, 1969). ISBN 978-0-933684-03-4
- Systematic Planning of Industrial Facilities (SPIF), 1979; 1980; 1999.
- Planning By Design, 2010
