= Predetermined motion time system =

A predetermined motion time system (PMTS) is frequently used to perform labor minute costing in order to set piece-rates, wage-rates or incentives in labor oriented industries by quantifying the amount of time required to perform specific tasks under defined conditions. Today the PMTS is mainly used in work measurement for shorter cycles in labour oriented industries such as apparel and footwear. This topic comes under wider industrial and production engineering. One of such a system is known as "work factor" and more popular methods-time measurement (MTM), released in 1948 exist today in several variations and used in some commercial applications.

New legislation in developed markets following sustainability issues, Living Wage movement and the 2013 disaster in Rana Plaza, Bangladesh have brought labor costing and standards back to the focus of activists and global fashion retailers. Occupational safety and health (OSH, OHS), ergonomics, skills development and job satisfaction are some of the other factors influenced by Labor Standards Act (Japan).

Predetermined motion time standard, predetermined time standards, and predetermined time systems (PTS) are other terms that describe same concept by different authors. Main outcome of PMTS application is quantifying labor inputs in terms of SMV (Standard Minute Value) or SAM (Stranded Allocated Minute).

== TMU ==
Most predetermined motion time systems (MTM and MOST) use time measurement units (TMU) instead of seconds for measuring time. One TMU is defined to be 0.00001 hours, or 0.036 seconds according to MTM100 and 0.0000083 hours, or 0.030 seconds according to BS100. These smaller units allow for more accurate calculations without the use of decimals. In the most in-depth PMT systems, motions observed will be on the level of individual TMUs, like toss (3 TMUs in MiniMOST) and simple pick-up (2 TMUs in MTM-1). More general systems simplify things by grouping individual elements, and thus have larger time values – for example, a bend and arise (61 TMUs in MTM-2) and one or two steps (30 TMUs in BasicMOST). Systems with even less detail work with TMU values in the hundreds, like climbing 10 rungs on a ladder (300 TMUs in MaxiMOST) or passing through a door (100 TMUs in MaxiMOST).

The choice of which variation of a certain PMTS to use is dependent on the need for accuracy in contrast to the need for quick analysis, as well as the length of the operation, the distances involved in the operation, and the repetitiveness of the operation. Longer operations often take place on a larger spatial scale, and tend to be less repetitive, so these issues are often treated as one. For longer, less repetitive operations, statistical analysis demonstrates that the accuracy of less detailed systems will generally approach the accuracy of more detailed systems. Thus, in order to reduce the time required for analysis, less detailed systems (like MTM-B and MaxiMOST) are usually used when possible. Conversely, very short, repetitive processes are commonly analyzed with more exact methods like MTM-1 and MiniMOST because of the need for accuracy.

== ILO and Manchester University research on GSD, MODAPTS & SewEasy ==
Manchester University researchers including Doug Miller, has gone deep into uses of PMTS in apparel labour costing in "Towards Sustainable Labour Costing in UK Fashion Retail". Doug says "...work measurement for arriving at a standard time should normally make provision for relaxation, contingency and special allowances." According to the International Labour Organization (ILO), as of 1992 there were some 200 different PTS systems.

== Canadian Apparel Federation, CAF ==
As the supply chain delays or disruptions keep many apparel executives on edge at regular intervals, especially with the ever shortening life cycle of fast fashion CAF explored how PMTS weigh in their fashion value chain by conducting series of programs including an awareness WEBINAR on SewEasy PMTS software systems, based on MTM standard.

== Fair Wear Foundation, FWF ==
Fair Wear Foundation, a non-profit whose mission is to see a world where the garment industry supports workers in realizing their rights to safe, dignified, properly paid employment used the SewEasy PMTS approach to formulate the country wise, living wage adjustment known as labour minute costing calculators.

== See also ==
Closely related manufacturing improvement methodologies:

- Toyota Production System
- Theory of constraints
- Time and motion study
- Value-stream mapping

Modern concepts and related terminology:

- Production levelling
- Takt time
- Direct labor cost
