= Methods engineering =

Subspecialty of industrial engineering

Methods engineering is a subspecialty of industrial engineering and manufacturing engineering concerned with human integration in industrial production processes.

== Overview ==
Alternatively it can be described as the design of the productive process in which a person is involved. The task of the Methods engineer is to decide where humans will be utilized in the process of converting raw materials to finished products and how workers can most effectively perform their assigned tasks. The terms operation analysis, work design and simplification, and methods engineering and corporate re-engineering are frequently used interchangeably.

Lowering costs and increasing reliability and productivity are the objectives of methods engineering. Methods efficiency engineering focuses on lowering costs through productivity improvement. It investigates the output obtained from each unit of input and the speed of each machine and man. Methods quality engineering focuses on increasing quality and reliability. These objectives are met in a five step sequence as follows: Project selection, data acquisition and presentation, data analysis, development of an ideal method based on the data analysis and, finally, presentation and implementation of the method.

== Methods engineering topics ==
=== Project selection ===
Methods engineers typically work on projects involving new product design, products with a high cost of production to profit ratio, and products associated with having poor quality issues. Different methods of project selection include the Pareto analysis, fish diagrams, Gantt charts, PERT charts, and job/work site analysis guides.

=== Data acquisition and presentation ===
Data that needs to be collected are specification sheets for the product, design drawings, process plans, quantity and delivery requirements, and projections as to how the product will perform or has performed in the market. Process charts are used to describe proposed or existing way of doing work utilizing machines and men. The Gantt process chart can assist in the analysis of the man to machine interaction and it can aid in establishing the optimum number of workers and machines subject to the financial constraints of the operation. A flow diagram is frequently employed to represent the manufacturing process associated with the product.

=== Data analysis ===
Data analysis enables the methods engineer to make decisions about several things, including: purpose of the operation, part design characteristics, specifications and tolerances of parts, materials, manufacturing process design, setup and tooling, working conditions, material handling, plant layout, and workplace design. Knowing the specifics (who, what, when, where, why, and how) of product manufacturing assists in the development of an optimum manufacturing method.

=== Ideal method development ===
Equations of synchronous and random servicing as well as line balancing are used to determine the ideal worker to machine ratio for the process or product chosen. Synchronous servicing is defined as the process where a machine is assigned to more than one operator, and the assigned operators and machine are occupied during the whole operating cycle. Random servicing of a facility, as the name indicates, is defined as a servicing process with a random time of occurrence and need of servicing variables. Line balancing equations determine the ideal number of workers needed on a production line to enable it to work at capacity.

=== Presentation and methods implementation ===
The industrial process or operation can be optimized using a variety of available methods. Each method design has its advantages and disadvantages. The best overall method is chosen using selection criteria and concepts involving value engineering, cost-benefit analysis, crossover charts, and economic analysis. The outcome of the selection process is then presented to the company for implementation at the plant. This last step involves "selling the idea" to the company brass, a skill the methods engineer must develop in addition to the normal engineering qualifications.

== See also ==
- Work design
- Motion analysis
