= Work design =

Area of research and practice within industrial and organizational psychology

Work design (also referred to as job design or task design) is an area of research and practice within industrial and organizational psychology, and is concerned with the "content and organization of one's work tasks, activities, relationships, and responsibilities" (p. 662). Research has demonstrated that work design has important implications for individual employees (e.g., employee engagement, job strain, risk of occupational injury), teams (e.g., how effectively groups co-ordinate their activities), organisations (e.g., productivity, occupational safety and health targets), and society (e.g., utilizing the skills of a population or promoting effective aging).

The terms job design and work design are often used interchangeably in psychology and human resource management literature, and the distinction is not always well-defined. A job is typically defined as an aggregation of tasks assigned to individual. However, in addition to executing assigned technical tasks, people at work often engage in a variety of emergent, social, and self-initiated activities. Some researchers have argued that the term job design therefore excludes processes that are initiated by incumbents (e.g., proactivity, job crafting) as well as those that occur at the level of teams (e.g., autonomous work groups). The term work design has been increasingly used to capture this broader perspective. Additionally, deliberate interventions aimed at altering work design are sometimes referred to as work redesign. Such interventions can be initiated by the management of an organization (e.g., job rotation, job enlargement, job enrichment) or by individual workers (e.g., job crafting, role innovation, idiosyncratic deals).

== History ==
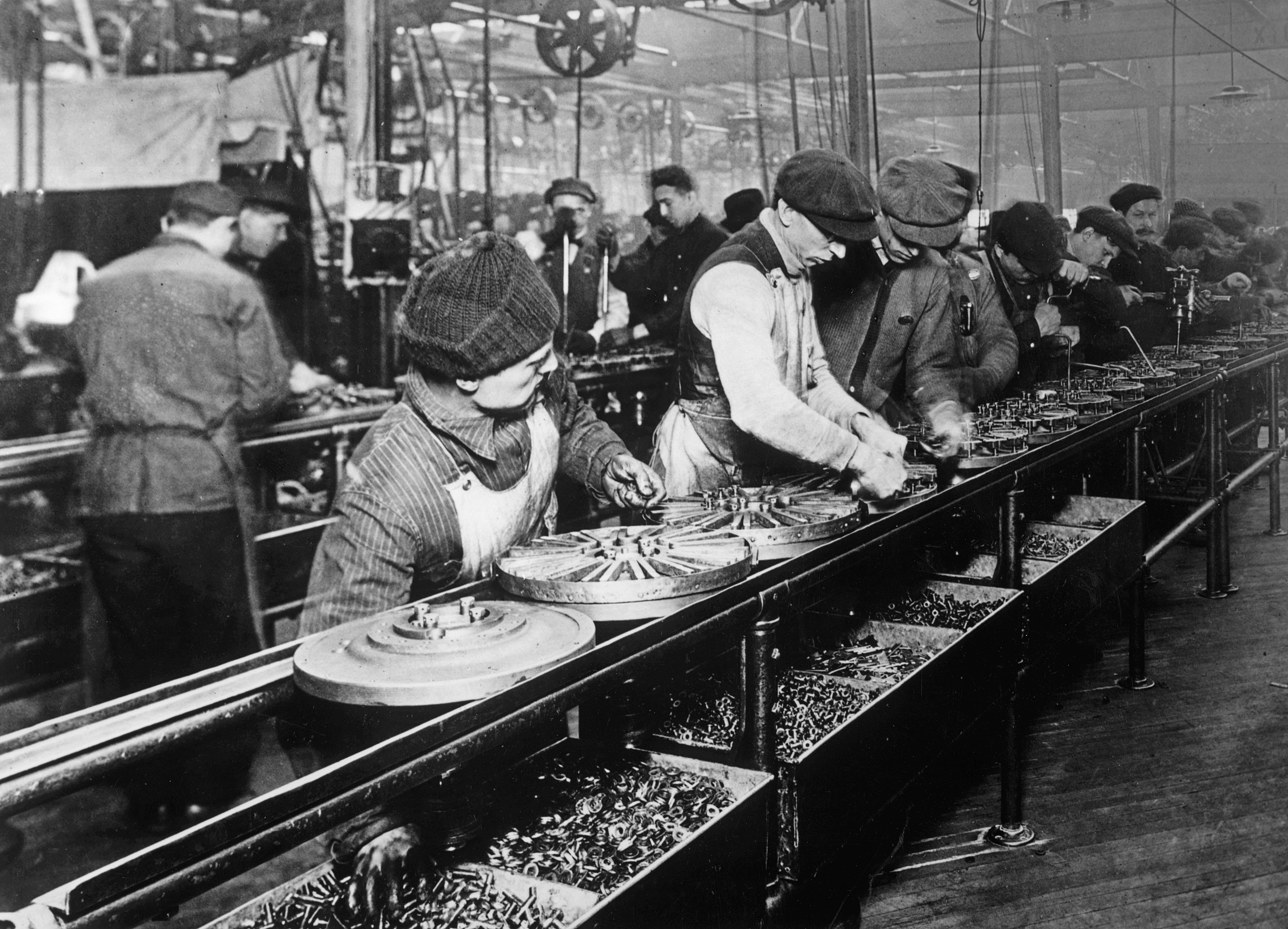
Ford Motor Company assembly line, 1913. An early work design based on scientific management principles.

Interest in the question of what makes good work was largely initiated during the industrial revolution, when machine-operated work in large factories replaced smaller, craft-based industries. In 1776, Adam Smith popularized the concept of division of labor in his book The Wealth of Nations, which states that dividing production processes into different stages would enable workers to focus on specific tasks, increasing overall productivity. This idea was further developed by Frederick Winslow Taylor in the late 19th century with his highly influential theory of scientific management (sometimes referred to as Taylorism). Taylor argued that jobs should be broken down into the smallest possible parts and managers should specify the one best way that these tasks should be carried out. Additionally, Taylor believed that maximum efficiency could only be achieved when managers were responsible for planning work while workers were responsible for performing tasks.

Scientific management became highly influential during the early 20th century, as the narrow tasks reduced training times and allowed less skilled and therefore cheaper labor to be employed. In 1910, Henry Ford took the ideas of scientific management further, introducing the idea of the automotive assembly line. In Ford's assembly lines, each worker was assigned a specific set of tasks, standing stationary while a mechanical conveyor belt brought the assemblies to the worker. While the assembly line made it possible to manufacture complex products at a fast rate, the jobs were extremely repetitive and workers were almost tied to the line.

Researchers began to observe that simplified jobs were negatively affecting employees' mental and physical health, while other negative consequences for organizations such as turnover, strikes, and absenteeism began to be documented. Over time, a field of research within industrial and organizational psychology known as job design, and more recently work design, emerged. Empirical work in the field flourished from the 1960s, and has become ever more relevant with modern technological developments that have changed the fundamental nature of work, such as automation, artificial intelligence, and remote work.

== Theoretical perspectives ==
=== Job characteristics model ===
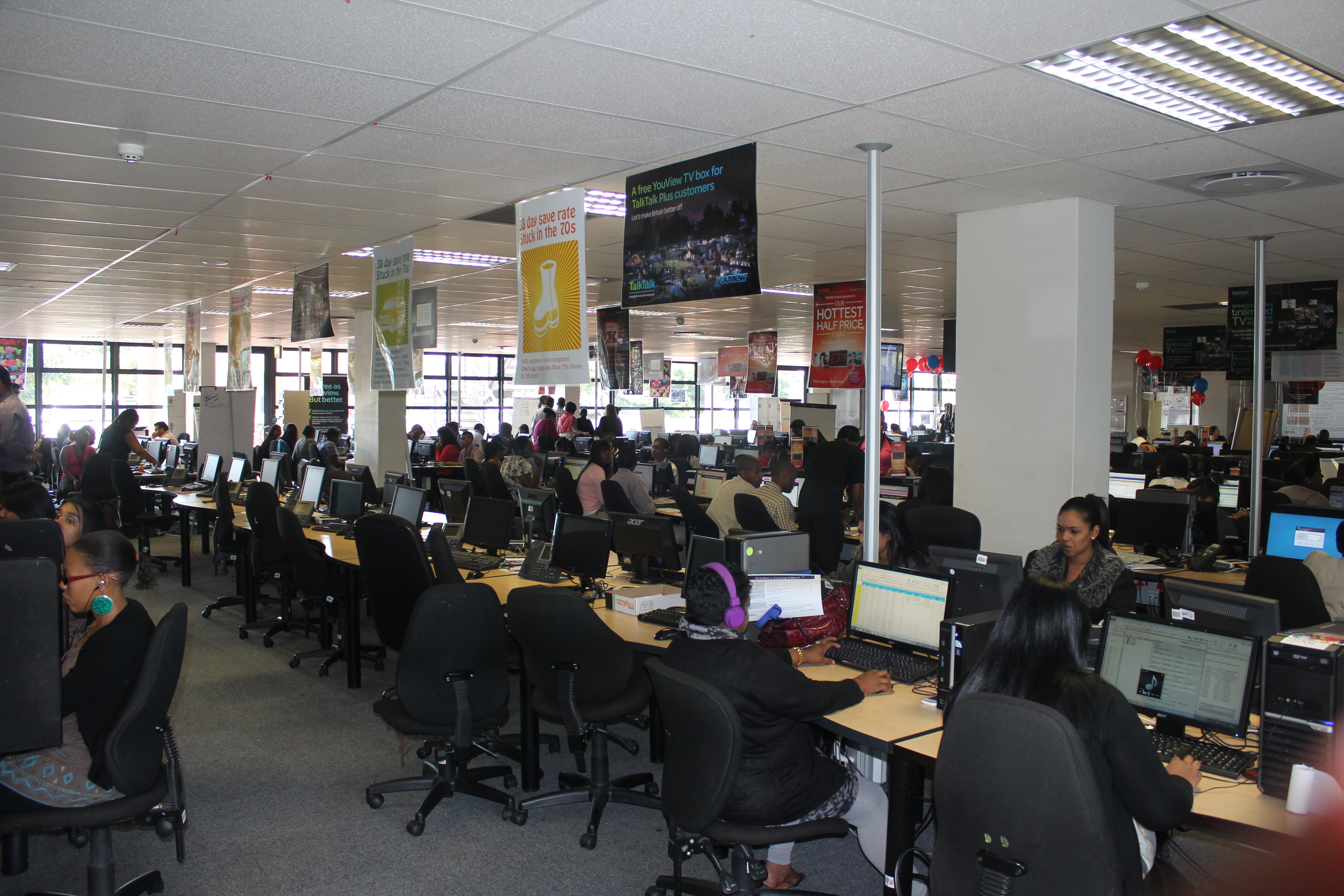
Call centre work is often characterised by restricted working conditions such as low autonomy, low task variety, and short task cycles. Consequently, turnover rates in call centres tend to be very high.

Hackman & Oldham's (1976) job characteristics model is generally considered to be the dominant motivational theory of work design. The model identifies five core job characteristics that affect five work-related outcomes (i.e. motivation, satisfaction, performance, and absenteeism and turnover) through three psychological states (i.e. experienced meaningfulness, experienced responsibility, and knowledge of results):

1. Skill variety – The degree to which a job involves a variety of activities, requiring the worker to develop a variety of skills and talents. Workers are more likely to have a more positive experience in jobs that require several different skills and abilities than when the jobs are elementary and routine.
2. Task identity – The degree to which the job requires completion of a whole and identifiable piece of work with a clear outcome. Workers are more likely have a more positive experience in a job when they are involved in the entire process rather than just being responsible for a part of the work.
3. Task significance – The degree to which a job has a substantial impact on the lives or work of others. Workers are more likely have a more positive experience in a job that substantially improves either psychological or physical well-being of others than a job that has limited effect on anyone else.
4. Autonomy – The degree to which the job provides the employee with significant freedom, independence, and discretion to plan out the work and determine the procedures in the job. For jobs with a high level of autonomy, the outcomes of the work depend on the workers' own efforts, initiatives, and decisions; rather than on the instructions from a manager or a manual of job procedures. In such cases, the jobholders experience greater personal responsibility for their own successes and failures at work.
5. Feedback – The degree to which a job incumbent has knowledge of results. When workers receive clear, actionable information about their work performance, they have better overall knowledge of the effect of their work activities, and what specific actions they need to take (if any) to improve their productivity.

The central proposition of job characteristics theory - that is, that work characteristics affect attitudinal outcomes - is well established by meta analysis. However, some have criticized the use of job incumbents' perceptions to assess job characteristics, arguing that individuals' perceptions are constructions arising from social influences, such as the attitudes of their peers.

Job characteristics theory has been described as the logical conclusion of efforts to understand how work can satisfy basic human needs. The development of the job characteristics model was largely stimulated by Frederick Herzberg's two factor theory (also known as motivator-hygiene theory). Although Herzberg's theory was largely discredited, the idea that intrinsic job factors impact motivation sparked an interest in the ways in which jobs could be enriched which culminated in the job characteristics model.

=== Sociotechnical systems ===
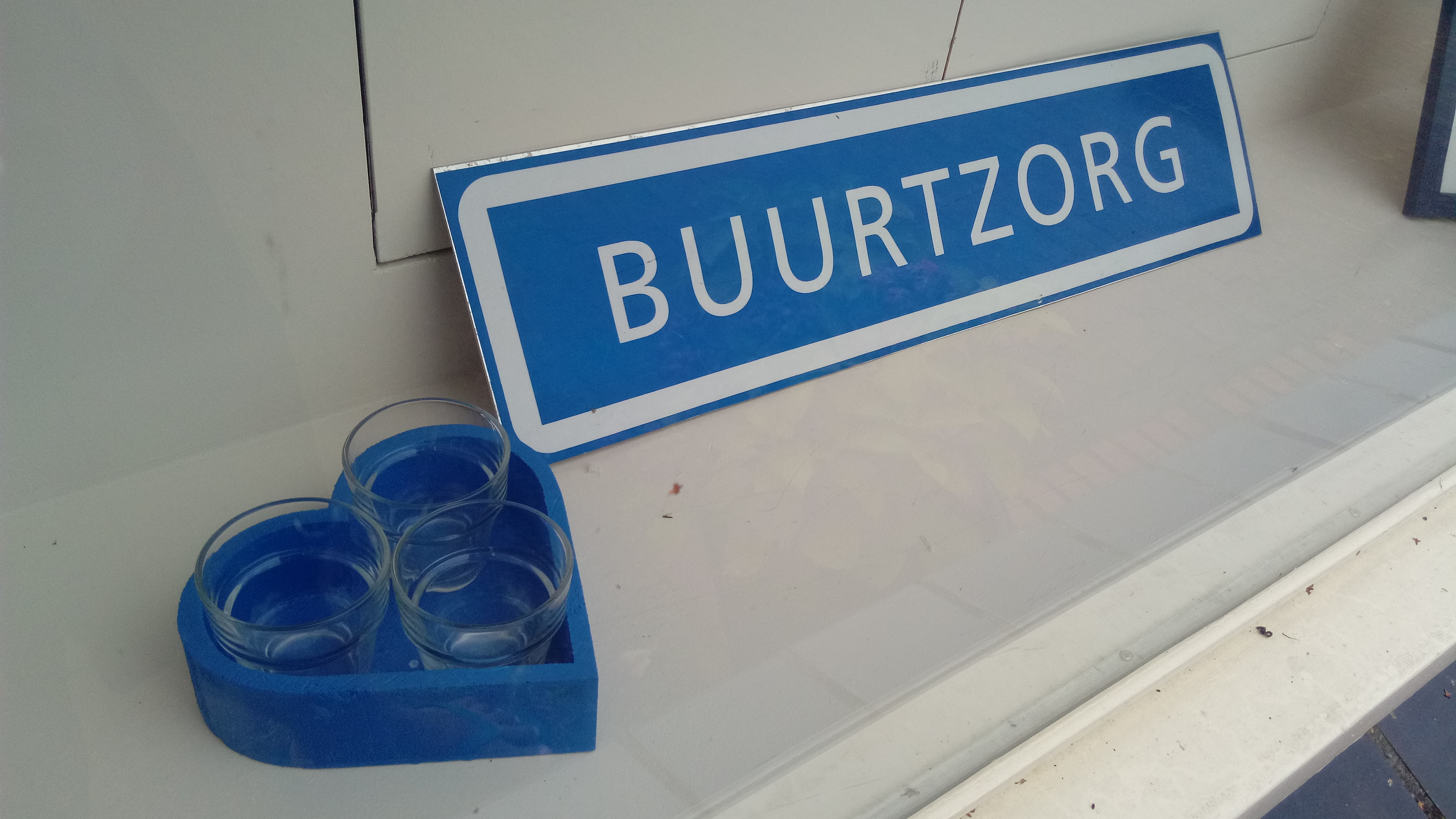
A well-known example of a sociotechnical systems approach to work design is Buurtzorg Nederland. Buurtzorg relies on self-managed teams of nurses to take responsibility for a given neighbourhood of patients, and is internationally recognised for its highly satisfied workforce.

Sociotechnical systems is an organizational development approach which proposes that the technical and social aspects of work should be jointly optimized when designing work. This contrasts with traditional methods that prioritize the technical component and then 'fit' people into it, often resulting in mediocre performance at a high social cost. Application of sociotechnical theory has typically focused on group rather than individual work design, and is responsible for the rise of autonomous work groups, which are still popular today.

One of the key principles of sociotechnical system design is that overall productivity is directly related to the system's accurate analysis of the social and technical needs. Accurate analysis of these needs typically results in the following work characteristics:

- Minimal critical specification of rules – Work design should be precise about what has to be done, but not how to do it. The use of rules, policies and procedures should be kept to a minimum.
- Variance control – Deviations from the ideal process should be controlled at the point where they originate.
- Multiskills – A work system will be more flexible and adaptive if each member of the system is skilled in more than one function.
- Boundary location – Interdependent roles should fall within the same departmental boundaries, usually drawn on the basis of technology, territory, and/or time.
- Information flow – Information systems should provide information at the point of problem solving rather than being based on hierarchical channels.
- Support congruence – The social system should reinforce behaviours which are intended by the work group structure.
- Design and human values – The design should achieve superior results by providing a high quality of work life for individuals.

=== Job demands-control model ===
Karasek's (1979) job demands-control model is the earliest and most cited model relating work design to occupational stress. The key assumption of this model is that low levels of work-related decision latitude (i.e. job control) combined with high workloads (i.e. job demands) can lead to poorer physical and mental health. For example, high pressure and demands at work may lead to a range of negative outcomes such as psychological stress, burnout, and compromised physical health. Additionally, the model suggests that high levels of job control can buffer or reduce the adverse health effects of high job demands. Instead, this high decision latitude can lead to feelings of mastery and confidence, which in turn aid the individual in coping with further job demands.

The job demands-control model is widely regarded as a classic work design theory, spurring large amounts of research. However, the model has been criticized for its focus on a narrow set of work characteristics. Additionally, while strong support has been found for the negative effects of high job demands, some researchers have argued that the buffering effect of high job control on the negative effects of demand is less convincing.

==== Job demands-resources model ====
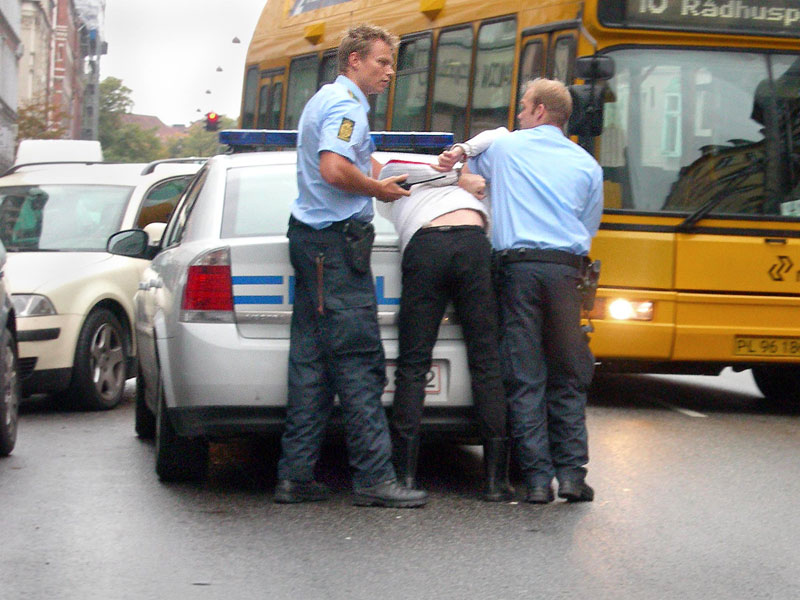
Policing is widely recognised as a stressful, emotionally trying, and dangerous occupation. This may be because the job demands of police officers (e.g., role conflict, role ambiguity, role overload) outweigh the job resources available (e.g., input into decision making, organizational support).

The job demands-resources model was introduced as a theoretical extension to the job demands-control model, and recognizes that other features of work in addition to control and support might serve as resources to counter job demands. The authors of the job demands-resources model argued that previous models of employee well-being "have been restricted to a given and limited set of predictor variables that may not be relevant for all job positions" (p. 309). Examples of the resources identified in this model include career opportunities, participation in decision making, and social support.

=== Relational job design theory ===
Relational job design theory is a popular contemporary approach to work design developed by American organizational psychologist Adam Grant, which builds on the foundations laid by Hackman & Oldham's (1976) job characteristics model. The core thesis of relational work design is that the work context shapes workers' motivations to care about making a prosocial difference (i.e. the desire to help or benefit others). Rather than focusing on the characteristics of tasks which make up jobs, relational work design is concerned with the 'relational architecture' of the workplace that influences workers' interpersonal relationships and connections with beneficiaries of the work. In this context, beneficiaries refer to the people whom the worker believes are affected by his or her work. An employer can design the relational architecture of the workplace as a means of motivating workers to care about making a prosocial difference.

Grant's theory makes a distinction between two key components of relational architecture:

- Impact on beneficiaries – This refers to the perception that one's work has a positive impact on the lives and well-being of others. A visible, positive impact of the job provides employees with a feeling that their tasks matter, which in turn results in higher prosocial motivation.
- Contact with beneficiaries – This refers to opportunities for employees to communicate and interact with the people who benefit from their work. Increased interaction with clients will result in employees will become more emotionally engaged "as a result of first-hand exposure to their actions affecting a living, breathing human being" (p. 307). Thus, increasing job contact results in higher prosocial motivation.

=== Learning and development approach ===
The learning and development approach to work design, advanced by Australian organizational behavior Professor Sharon K. Parker, draws on the findings of a diverse body of research which shows that certain job characteristics (e.g. high demands and control, autonomy, complex work with low supervision) can promote learning and development in workers. Parker argues that work design can not only shape cognitive, identity, and moral processes, but also speed up an individual's learning and development.

=== Economic theory ===
In economics, job design has been studied in the field of contract theory. In particular, Holmström and Milgrom (1991) have developed the multi-task moral hazard model. Some of the tasks are easier to measure than other tasks, so one can study which tasks should be bundled together. While the original model was focused on the incentives versus insurance trade-off when agents are risk-averse, subsequent work has also studied the case of risk-neutral agents who are protected by limited liability. In this framework, researchers have studied whether tasks that are in direct conflict with each other (for instance, selling products that are imperfect substitutes) should be delegated to the same agent or to different agents. The optimal task assignment depends on whether the tasks are to be performed simultaneously or sequentially.

== Measurement and diagnostics ==
=== Job Diagnostic Survey (JDS) ===
The Job Diagnostic Survey (JDS) was developed by Hackman and Oldham in 1975 to assess perceptions of the core job characteristics outlined in job characteristics theory. The JDS consists of seven scales measuring variety, autonomy, task identity, significance, job feedback, feedback from others, and dealing with others. Prior to the development of viable alternatives, the JDS was the most commonly used job design measure. However, some authors have criticised its focus on a narrow set of motivational characteristics and neglect of other important work characteristics. Additionally, the psychometric properties of the JDS have been brought into question, including a low internal consistency and problems with the factor structure.

=== Multimethod Job Design Questionnaire (MJDQ) ===
The Multimethod Job Design Questionnaire (MJDQ) was developed by Michael Campion in 1988 to assess what were, at the time, the main interdisciplinary approaches to work design (i.e. motivational, mechanistic, biological, perceptual motor). Intended to address the weaknesses of the JDS, the MJDQ suffered from both measurement problems and gaps in construct measurement.

=== Work Design Questionnaire (WDQ) ===
The Work Design Questionnaire (WDQ) was developed by Morgeson and Humphrey in 2006 as a comprehensive and integrative work design measure which addresses the inadequacies of its predecessors. The WDQ focuses not only on the tasks that make up a person's job, but also the relations between workers and the broader environment. The WDQ has since been translated into several languages other than English, including German, Italian, and Spanish.

== Antecedents of work design behaviours ==
Decisions about the organization of work are typically made by those in positions of formal authority, such as executives, managers, and team leaders. These decisions, which usually regard the division of labor and the integration of effort, create work designs in which employees have assigned tasks and responsibilities. In addition to work design arising from formal decision-making, work design can also be created through emergent, informal, and social processes (e.g. role expectations from peers). Usually, these types of processes arise from the actions and decisions of employees, meaning employees have a certain degree of agency in shaping their own work designs.

=== Motivation, knowledge, skills, and abilities (KSAs) ===
In accordance with the ability-motivation-opportunity model of behaviour, the work design-related decisions of individuals are shaped by their motivation and knowledge, skills, and abilities. These proximal processes apply to decision making in both people in formal positions of authority (i.e. managers) as well as individual employees. With respect to motivation, managers' decisions could be shaped by autonomous motivation (e.g. the desire the retain employees) or controlled motivation (e.g. reducing staffing costs). In terms of KSAs, managers' knowledge about work design options and their skills to engage employees in the decision-making process may shape their decisions. It is believed that these same processes apply to employees' work design-related actions and decisions.

=== Opportunity ===
Opportunity, in this context, refers to the uncontrollable forces surrounding an individual that enable or constrain the individuals task performance. Regardless of an individual's motivation or KSAs regarding a particular work design-related decision, that individual can only implement change if they have the opportunity to do so. For example, if a manager lacks the power to mobilise necessary resources, perhaps due to a rigid organizational hierarchy, their work design-related actions would be constrained.

=== Individual influences ===
- Demographics – Characteristics such as age, gender, and ethnicity can shape work design decisions. The more these attributes signal assumptions that the employee is competent and trustworthy, the more managers will be motivated to make role adjustments to improve work design. Additionally, there is evidence that demographic characteristics can affect the work design decision of employees. For example, older workers may be discouraged to renegotiate their work designs due to discriminatory attitudes in the workplace. Gender and ethnicity can make some workers more vulnerable to low-quality work designs, with data showing that female workers have less autonomy, fewer development opportunities, and reduced career possibilities. Evidence also suggests that migrant workers often have less enriched work designs compared to non-migrant workers.
- Competence and learning – Karasek and Theorell propose that enriched work designs create a self-perpetuating spiral by which the promotion of learning builds employees' mastery and competence, which in turn enables employees to take on more challenging tasks and responsibilities, generating further learning.
- Other individual differences – Personality traits and stable individual differences such as motivation and initiative can affect both managerial and individual work design-related decision making. For example, personality traits may affect who managers select for particular jobs as well as an employee's choice of occupation.

=== Contextual influences ===
- International – Organizations operate today under the influence of globalization and market liberalization. While there is little empirical work on the direct effects of these factors, some have argued that globalization has increased the perceived threat of competition and job insecurity, leading to increased expectations about working harder. Additionally, increased access to new suppliers in other countries, especially developing countries, has increased the potential for organizations to influence work design in these countries. Evidence has shown that cost pressures on suppliers are linked to poor work designs, such as high workloads and physical demands.
- National – Organizations are subject to the economic, cultural, and institutional context of the country they operate in. Work designs in economies with a relatively high GDP and low employment typically have lower workloads and higher job resources (e.g. autonomy, skill variety, challenge) due to higher investment in practices aimed at attracting and retaining employees. Additionally, some have argued that national culture shapes individual preferences for particular working conditions. For example, managers and employees from cultures with a preference for structure and formal rules might prefer work designs which are clearly defined. Finally, national institutions such as trade unions, national employment policies, and training systems policies may have direct or indirect effects on work design.
- Occupational – Occupations shape the distribution of tasks as well as the influence of skills used in completing those tasks, both of which are key to work design. Additionally, occupations tend to encourage and reinforce particular values, which may or may not be congruent with the values of individual workers. For example, occupations which value independence (e.g. police detectives) are likely to reward actions which demonstrate initiative and creativity, giving rise to job characteristics such as autonomy and variety.
- Organizational – According to strategic human resource management theory (SHRM), a key task for managers is to adopt HR practices which are internally consistent with the strategic objectives of the organization. For example, if an organization's strategy is to gain competitive advantage by minimizing costs, managers may be motivated to adopt work designs based on scientific management (i.e. low training and induction costs to allow low-skill and low-paid workers to be employed). In contrast, managers working for an organization that aims to gain competitive advantage through quality and innovation may be motivated to provide employees with opportunities to use specialist knowledge and skills, resulting in enriched work designs.
- Work groups – Drawing on the sociotechnical theory and team effectiveness literature, some authors argue that key characteristics of work groups (i.e. composition, interdependence, autonomy, and leadership) can influence the work design of individual team members, although it is acknowledged that evidence on this particular topic is limited.

== Strategies for work (re)design ==
=== Managerial strategies ===
==== Job rotation ====
Job rotation is a job design process by which employee roles are rotated in order to promote flexibility and tenure in the working environment. Through job rotation, employees laterally mobilize and serve their tasks in different organizational levels; when an individual experiences different posts and responsibilities in an organization, the ability to evaluate his or her capabilities in the organization increases. By design, it is intended to enhance motivation, develop workers' outlook, increase productivity, improve the organization's performance on various levels by its multi-skilled workers, and provides new opportunities to improve the attitude, thought, capabilities and skills of workers.

==== Job enlargement ====
Hulin and Blood (1968) define job enlargement as the process of allowing individual workers to determine their own pace (within limits), to serve as their own inspectors by giving them responsibility for quality control, to repair their own mistakes, to be responsible for their own machine set-up and repair, and to attain choice of method. By working in a larger scope, as Hulin and Blood state, workers are pushed to adapting new tactics, techniques, and methodologies on their own. Frederick Herzberg referred to the addition of interrelated tasks as 'horizontal job loading,' or, in other words, widening the breadth of an employee's responsibilities.

==== Job enrichment ====
Job enrichment increases the employees' autonomy over the planning and execution of their own work, leading to self-assigned responsibility. Because of this, job enrichment has the same motivational advantages of job enlargement, however it has the added benefit of granting workers autonomy. Frederick Herzberg viewed job enrichment as 'vertical job loading' because it also includes tasks formerly performed by someone at a higher level where planning and control are involved.

=== Individual strategies ===
==== Job crafting ====
Job crafting can be defined as the proactive changing the boundaries and conditions of the tasks, relationships, and meaning of a job. These changes are not negotiated with the employer and may not even be noticed by the manager. Job crafting behaviours have been found to lead to a variety of positive work outcomes, including work engagement, job satisfaction, resilience, and thriving.

==== Role innovation ====
Role innovation occurs when an employee proactively redefines a work role by changing the mission or practice of the role. When work roles are defined by organizations they do not always adequately address the problems faced by the profession. When employees notice this, they can attempt to redefine the role through innovation, improving the resilience of the profession in handling future situations.

==== Task revision ====
Task revision is seen as a form of counter-role behavior in that it is about resistance to defective work procedures, such as inaccurate job descriptions and dysfunctional expectations. This may involves acting against the norms of the organization with the end goal of making corrections to procedures. It has been noted that task revision rarely occurs in work settings as this type of resistance is often seen as inappropriate by managers and employees alike. However, a work environment which is supportive of deviation from social norms could facilitate task revision.

==== Voice ====
In the context of job redesign, voice refers to behaviours which emphasize challenging the status quo with the intention of improving the situation rather than merely criticizing. This can be as simple as suggesting more effective ways of doing things within the organization. When individuals stand up and express innovating ideas, the organization may benefit from these fresh perspectives. Voice may be particularly important in organizations where change and innovation is necessary for survival. While the individual employee does not immediately benefit from this expression, successful innovations may lead to improved performance appraisals.

==== Idiosyncratic deals ====
Idiosyncratic deals, also known as i-deals, is a concept developed by American organizational psychologist Denise Rousseau which refers to individualized work arrangements negotiated proactively by an employee with their employer. The most common forms of i-deals are flexible working hours and opportunities for personal development. However, also other forms of Idiosyncratic deals are known from previous research, such as task and work responsibilities, workload reduction, location flexibility, and financial Incentives These arrangements may be put in place because an employer values the negotiating employee, and by granting the i-deal the likelihood of retaining the employee is increased. This can be seen as a win-win scenario for both parties.

==== Personal initiative ====
Personal initiative refers to self-starting behaviours by an employee that are consistent with the mission of the organization, has a long term focus, are goal directed and action oriented, and are persistent in the face of difficulty. Additionally, these behaviours typically go beyond what is required of the employee in their work role.

== See also ==
- Industrial and organizational psychology
- Applied psychology
- Occupational health psychology
- Management
- Organizational behaviour
- Work motivation
- Applied psychology
- Occupational health psychology
