= Job characteristic theory =

Theory of work design

Job characteristics theory is a theory of work design. It provides "a set of implementing principles for enriching jobs in organizational settings". The original version of job characteristics theory proposed a model of five "core" job characteristics (i.e., skill variety, task identity, task significance, autonomy, and feedback) that affect five work-related outcomes (i.e., motivation, satisfaction, performance, and absenteeism and turnover) through three psychological states (i.e., experienced meaningfulness, experienced responsibility, and knowledge of results).

== History ==
Work redesign first got its start in the 1960s. Up until then, the prevailing attitude was that jobs should be simplified in order to maximize production, however it was found that when subjected to highly routinized and repetitive tasks, the benefits of simplification sometimes disappeared due to worker dissatisfaction. It was proposed that jobs should be enriched in ways that boosted motivation, instead of just simplified to a string of repetitive tasks. It is from this viewpoint that Job Characteristics Theory emerged.

In 1975, Greg R. Oldham and J. Richard Hackman constructed the original version of the Job Characteristics Theory (JCT), which is based on earlier work by Turner and Lawrence and Hackman and Lawler. Turner and Lawrence, provided a foundation of objective characteristics of jobs in work design. Further, Hackman and Lawler indicated the direct effect of job characteristics on employee's work related attitudes and behaviors and, more importantly, the individual differences in need for development, which is called Growth Need Strength in Job Characteristics Theory.

In 1980, Hackman and Oldham presented the final form of the Job Characteristics Theory in their book Work Redesign. The main changes included the addition of two more moderators- Knowledge and Skill and Context Satisfaction, removal of the work outcomes of absenteeism and turnover, and increased focus on Internal Work Motivation. Several of the outcome variables were removed or renamed as well. Concentration was shifted to the affective outcomes following results from empirical studies that showed weak support for the relationship between the psychological states and behavioral outcomes.

In addition to the theory, Oldham and Hackman also created two instruments, the Job Diagnostic Survey (JDS) and the Job Rating Form (JRF), for assessing constructs of the theory. The JDS directly measures jobholders' perceptions of the five core job characteristics, their experienced psychological states, their Growth Need Strength, and outcomes. The JRF was designed to obtain the assessments from external observers, such as supervisors or researchers, of the core job characteristics.

== Important variables ==
According to the final version of the theory, five core job characteristics should prompt three critical psychological states, which lead to many favorable personal and work outcomes. The moderators Growth Need Strength, Knowledge and Skill, and Context Satisfaction should moderate the links between the job characteristics and the psychological states, and the psychological states and the outcomes.

=== Core job characteristics ===
- Skill Variety: The degree to which a job requires various activities, requiring the worker to develop a variety of skills and talents. Jobholders can experience more meaningfulness in jobs that require several different skills and abilities than when the jobs are elementary and routine.
- Task Identity: The degree to which the job requires the jobholders to identify and complete a workpiece with a visible outcome. Workers experience more meaningfulness in a job when they are involved in the entire process rather than just being responsible for a part of the work.
- Task Significance: The degree to which the job affects other people's lives. The influence can be either in the immediate organization or in the external environment. Employees feel more meaningfulness in a job that substantially improves either psychological or physical well-being of others than a job that has limited effect on anyone else.
- Autonomy: The degree to which the job provides the employee with significant freedom, independence, and discretion to plan out the work and determine the procedures in the job. For jobs with a high level of autonomy, the outcomes of the work depend on the workers’ own efforts, initiatives, and decisions; rather than on the instructions from a manager or a manual of job procedures. In such cases, the jobholders experience greater personal responsibility for their own successes and failures at work.
- Feedback: The degree to which the worker has knowledge of results. This is clear, specific, detailed, actionable information about the effectiveness of the job performance. The feedback should be as direct as possible: Direct feedback comes from the task itself rather than from the judgement of others. When workers receive clear, actionable information about their work performance, they have better overall knowledge of the effect of their work activities, and what specific actions they need to take (if any) to improve their productivity.

=== Critical psychological states ===
- Experienced Meaningfulness of the Work: The degree to which the jobholder experiences the work as intrinsically meaningful and can present his or her value to other people and/or the external environment.
- Experienced Responsibility for Outcome of the Work: The degree to which the worker feels he or she is accountable and responsible for the results of the work.
- Knowledge of Results of the Work Activities: The degree to which the jobholder knows how well he or she is performing.

=== Outcomes ===
Adopted from earlier work the personal and work outcomes of the initial theory were: Internal Work Motivation, Job Satisfaction, Absenteeism and Turnover, and Performance Quality. However, the 1980 revisions to the original model included removing absenteeism and turnover, and breaking performance into Quality of Work and Quantity of Work.

=== Moderators ===
- Growth Need Strength (GNS): GNS is the strength of a person's need for personal accomplishment, learning, and development”. The theory posits that Growth Need Strength moderates both the relationship of core job characteristics and psychological states, and the relationship between psychological states and outcomes.
- Knowledge and Skill: The level of knowledge and skill the worker possesses can moderate the relationship between the mediators and the job characteristics and outcomes. For motivating jobs, adequate knowledge and skill lead to experiencing the critical psychological states and better outcomes, while insufficient knowledge and skill discourage the psychological states and result in more negative outcomes. Unmotivating jobs don't allow the worker to experience the psychological states at all, thus knowledge and skill have no effect.
- Context Satisfaction: The context of the job also affects employees’ experience. The authors suggest that when workers are satisfied with things like their managers, pay, co-workers, and job security they respond more positively to highly motivating jobs and less positively when they are not satisfied. The reason being that they must use attentional resources to handle the undesirable work context, which distracts from the richness otherwise inherent in the job.

== Propositions ==
The three critical psychological states of job characteristic theory (JCT) draw upon cognitive motivation theory and some previous work on identifying the presence of certain psychological states could lead to favorable outcomes. JCT provided the chance to systematically assess the relationship between the previously discovered psychological states ('Experienced Meaningfulness, 'Experienced Responsibility, and Knowledge of Results) and outcomes. More importantly, previous work on work design showed job characteristics can predict individual performance, but did not provide “why” and “how” this relationship existed. Job Characteristics Theory filled this gap by building a bridge between job characteristics and work-related outcomes through the use of the three critical psychological states.

The three psychological states, which are also the conceptual core of the theory, include:

- experienced meaningfulness of the work;
- experienced responsibility for the outcomes of the work;
- knowledge of the results of work activities.

These psychological states are theorized to mediate the relationship between job characteristics and work-related outcomes. According to the theory, these three critical psychological states are noncompensatory conditions, meaning jobholders have to experience all three critical psychological states to achieve the outcomes proposed in the model. For example, when workers experience the three psychological states, they feel good about themselves when they perform well. These positive feelings, in turn, reinforce the workers to keep performing well.

According to the theory, certain core job characteristics are responsible for each psychological state: skill variety, task identity, and task significance shape the experienced meaningfulness; autonomy affects experienced responsibility, and feedback contributes to the knowledge of results. Previous research found that four job characteristics (autonomy, variety, identity, and feedback) could increase workers' performance, satisfaction, and attendance. Task significance was derived from Greg Oldham's own work experience as an assembly line worker. Though his job did not provide task variety or identity, he still experienced meaningfulness through the realization that others depended on his work. This realization led to the inclusion of task significance as another job characteristic that would influence experienced meaningfulness of the job. Thus, job characteristics theory proposed the five core job characteristics that could predict work related outcomes.

=== Motivating potential score ===
When a job has a high score on the five core characteristics, it is likely to generate three psychological states, which can lead to positive work outcomes, such as high internal work motivation, high satisfaction with the work, high quality work performance, and low absenteeism and turnover. This tendency for high levels of job characteristics to lead to positive outcomes can be formulated by the motivating potential score (MPS). Hackman and Oldham explained that the MPS is an index of the "degree to which a job has an overall high standing on the person's degree of motivation...and, therefore, is likely to prompt favorable personal and work outcomes":

The motivating potential score (MPS) can be calculated, using the core dimensions discussed above, as follows:

$${\text{MPS}}=\frac{\text{Skill Variety + Task Identity + Task Significance } }{\text{3} }{\text{ x Autonomy x Feedback}}$$

Jobs that are high in motivating potential must be also high on at least one of the three factors that lead to experienced meaningfulness, and also must be high on both Autonomy and Feedback. If a job has a high MPS, the job characteristics model predicts that motivation, performance and job satisfaction will be positively affected and the likelihood of negative outcomes, such as absenteeism and turnover, will be reduced.

According to the equation above, a low standing on either autonomy or feedback will substantially compromise a job's MPS, because autonomy and feedback are the only job characteristics expected to foster experienced responsibility and knowledge of results, respectively. On the contrary, a low score on one of the three job characteristics that lead to experienced meaningfulness may not necessarily reduce a job's MPS, because a strong presence of one of those three attributes can offset the absence of the others.

=== Individual difference factor ===
In response to one of the disadvantages of Motivator–Hygiene Theory, Job Characteristics Theory added an individual difference factor into the model. While Herzberg et al. took into account the importance of intrinsically and extrinsically motivating job characteristics there was no consideration of individual differences. The importance of individual differences had been demonstrated by previous work showing that some individuals are more likely to positively respond to an enriched job environment than others. Thus, the original version of the theory posits an individual difference characteristic, Growth Need Strength (GNS), that moderates the effect of the core job characteristics on outcomes. Jobholders with high Growth Need Strength should respond more positively to the opportunities provided by jobs with high levels of the five core characteristics compared to low GNS jobholders.

== Alternative theories of work design ==
=== Scientific management ===
Taylor's theory of scientific management emphasized efficiency and productivity through the simplification of tasks and division of labor.

=== Motivator–hygiene theory ===
Herzberg et al.'s motivator–hygiene theory sought to increase motivation and satisfaction through enriching jobs. The theory predicts changes in "motivators", which are intrinsic to the work, (such as recognition, advancement, and achievement) will lead to higher levels of employee motivation and satisfaction; while "hygiene factors", which are extrinsic to the work itself, (such as company policies and salary) can lead to lower levels of dissatisfaction, but will not actually effect satisfaction or motivation.

=== Sociotechnical systems theory ===
Sociotechnical systems theory predicts an increase in satisfaction and productivity through designing work that optimized person-technology interactions.

=== Quality improvement theory ===
Quality improvement theory is based on the idea that jobs can be improved through the analysis and optimized of work processes.

=== Adaptive structuration theory ===
Adaptive structuration theory provides a way to look at the interaction between technology's intended and actual use in an organization, and how it can influence different work-related outcomes.

== Variations ==
=== Reverse scoring correction ===
Idaszak and Drasgow provided a corrected version of the Job Diagnostic Survey that corrected for one of the measurement errors in the instrument. It had been suggested that reverse scoring on several of the questions was to blame for the inconsistent studies looking at the factors involved in the Job Diagnostic Survey. Following a factor analysis, Idaszak and Drasgow found six factors rather than the theorized five characteristics proposed by the Job Characteristics Theory. Upon further investigation, they were able to show that the sixth factor was made up of the reverse coded items. The authors rephrased the questions, ran the analysis again, and found it removed the measurement error.

=== GN–GO model ===
Due to the inconsistent findings about the validity of Growth Need Strength as a moderator of the Job characteristic-outcomes relationship, Graen, Scandura, and Graen proposed the GN–GO model, which added Growth Opportunity as another moderator. They suggested there isn't a simple positive relationship between motivation and Growth Need Strength, but instead there is an underlying incremental (stairstep) relationship with various levels of Growth Opportunity. Growth Opportunity increments are described as "events that change either the characteristics of the job itself or the understanding of the job itself". It was hypothesized that as people high in Growth Need Strength met each level of Growth Opportunity they could be motivated to increase their performance, but when people low on Growth Need Strength met these same increments their performance would either maintain or degrade. Field studies found more support for the GN–GO model than the original Growth Need Strength moderation.

=== Extension of characteristics and outcomes ===
Humphrey, Nahrgang, and Morgeson extended the original model by incorporating many different outcomes and job characteristics. The authors divided the revised set of Job Characteristics into three sections- Motivational, Social, and Work Context Characteristics; and the outcomes were portioned out into four parts- Behavioral, Attitudinal, Role Perception, and Well-being Outcomes. Results showed strong relationships between some of the expanded characteristics and outcomes, suggesting that there are more options for enriching jobs than the original theory would suggest.

=== Psychological ownership ===
Taking from earlier empirical research on Job Characteristics Theory and Psychological Ownership, researchers developed a model that combined the two theories. They replaced the psychological states of the Job Characteristics Theory with Psychological Ownership of the job as the mediator between job characteristics and outcomes. In addition to the positive personal and work outcomes of Job Characteristics Theory, negative outcomes (e.g. Territorial Behaviors, Resistance to Change, and Burden of Responsibility) were added.

== Empirical tests ==
Since its inception, Job Characteristics Theory has been scrutinized extensively. The first empirical tests of the theory came from Hackman and Oldham themselves. The authors found the "internal consistency reliability of the scales and the discriminant validity of the items" to be "satisfactory". They also tried to assess the objectivity of the measure by having the supervisors and the researchers evaluate the job in addition to the jobholders. More importantly, the authors reported the relationships predicted by the model were supported by their analysis.

Following these publications, over 200 empirical articles were published examining Job Characteristics Theory over the next decade. Fried and Ferris summarized the research on Job Characteristics Theory and found “modest support” overall. Fried and Ferris mentioned seven general areas of criticism in their review, which are discussed below:

- Relation of objective and perceived job characteristics: Whether or not there is accuracy in the worker's perceptions of job characteristics is an important topic of concern for Job Characteristics Theory. Inaccurate ratings of the five job characteristics can be detrimental to the job enrichment process because the Job Diagnostic Survey, which is instrumental in determining what enrichment needs to take place, relies on jobholders' perceptions.
- Influential forces on job perceptions: Social cues, personal factors, and what order the portions of the Job Diagnostic Survey is given can influence job perceptions. These "irrelevant cues" could color one's perception of the job characteristics.
- Perceived versus objective job characteristics-outcomes relationships: Researchers have also been concerned about the objectivity of jobholders’ assessment of job characteristics and work outcomes, however studies have tended to show that this fear is largely unfounded.
- Factors of the Job Diagnostic Survey: The support for the five dimensions of job characteristics in Job Characteristics Theory have mixed support among the studies examining the factor solutions of the Job Diagnostic Survey.
- The job characteristics-outcomes relationships: Researchers have argued job characteristics have a stronger relationship with personal outcomes, than with work outcomes. More importantly, it was found that the Motivating Potential Score was not as predictive as adding up rater's assessment of the five job characteristics.
- Mediator effects of critical psychological states: Researchers have found support for the mediating role of psychological states between job characteristics and personal outcomes, but didn't find similar evidence for the mediation on work outcomes.
- Growth Need Strength's use as a moderator: There have been several studies investigating the validity of Growth Need Strength as a moderator. Many of the studies reported the moderating effect of Growth Need Strength to be low.

== New developments ==
Over the years since Job Characteristics Theory's introduction into the organizational literature, there have been many changes to the field and to work itself. Oldham and Hackman suggest that the areas more fruitful for development in work design are social motivation, job crafting, and teams.

Social sources of motivation are becoming more important due to the changing nature of many fields of work. More jobs are requiring higher levels of client-employee interaction, as well as increasing interdependence among employees. With this in mind, it would make sense to investigate the effect the social aspects have on affective and behavioral outcomes.

While Job Characteristics Theory was mainly focused on the organization's responsibility for manipulating job characteristics to enrich jobs there has been a considerable buzz in the literature regarding job crafting. In job crafting the employee has some control over their role in the organization. Hackman and Oldham point out there are many avenues of inquiry regarding job crafting such as: what are the benefits of job crafting, are the benefits due to the job crafting process itself or the actual changes made to the job, and what are the negative effects of job crafting?

Finally, they brought up the potential research directions relevant to team work design. Specifically, they discuss the need to understand when to use work-design aimed at the individual or team level in order to increase performance, and what type of team is best suited to particular tasks.

== Practical implications ==
Job Characteristics Theory is firmly entrenched within the work design (also called job enrichment) literature, moreover the theory has become one of the most cited in all of the organizational behavior field. In practical terms, Job Characteristics Theory provides a framework for increasing employees' motivation, satisfaction, and performance through enriching job characteristics.

Job Characteristics Theory has been embraced by researchers and used in a multitude of professions and organizations. In the applied domain, Hackman and Oldham have reported that a number of consulting firms have employed their model or modified it to meet their needs.

== See also ==
- Core self-evaluations
- Industrial and organizational psychology
- Job satisfaction
- Motivation
- Positive psychology in the workplace
- Work design
- Work motivation
