= Sharon Parker =

Sharon Parker may refer to:

- Sharon K. Parker, Australian organisational psychologist and academic
- Hawkwoman (Sharon Parker), a DC comics character

== See also ==
- Sharon Barker (born 1949), Canadian-American women's rights activist
