= Qualitative Research Reports in Communication =

- Discipline: Communications
- Language: English

Publication details
- History: 1999-Present
- Publisher: Eastern Communication Association (United States)

Standard abbreviations
- ISO 4: Qual. Res. Rep. Commun.

Indexing
- ISSN: 1745-9435 (print); 1745-9443 (web)

Links
- Journal homepage

Qualitative Research Reports in Communication is a peer-reviewed annual academic journal sponsored by the Eastern Communication Association. The journal publishes brief qualitative and critical research essays of 2,500 words or less on a wide range of topics extending and enhancing the understanding of human communication. Research essays relating to human communication covering studies of intercultural, media, political, organizations, rhetorical, interpersonal and legal communication are typical submissions.
