= Proactive communications =

Customer relationship strategy

Proactive communications is a customer relationship lifecycle strategy used to increase customer loyalty. It is related to the organizational psychology term proactivity, which states that individuals should act based on anticipatory behavior rather than reacting to situations. The strategy is used to provide customer care and build credibility through personalized customer management to anticipate common inquiries. It is used to reduce customer frustration and mitigate customer service issues before having the ability to happen.

Proactive communications include opt-in notifications and chats, social media responsiveness and multi-channel contact. The strategy is used during each phase of the customer lifecycle. The goal of proactive customer communications is to anticipate and streamline all interactions to be efficient and personalized for each customer.

== Client retention ==
According to Direct Marketing News, there are three steps to improve customer loyalty through the use of proactive communications:

1. Develop an understanding of the target audience and provide options for opt-in communications
2. Tailored communications based on the individual customer's needs
3. Customer control options for contact

== See also ==
- Augmentative and alternative communication – Techniques used for those with communication impairments
- Communication – Transmission of information
- Communication rights – Right to freely communicate
- Cross-cultural communication – Field of study that looks at how people from differing cultural backgrounds communicate
- Human communication
- Intercultural communication – Discipline that studies communication across different cultures and social groups
- Mass communication – Mass media information exchange
- Proactivity – Self-initiated behavior pattern
