= Sharon K. Parker =

Australian organisational psychologist and academic

Sharon K. Parker FASSA
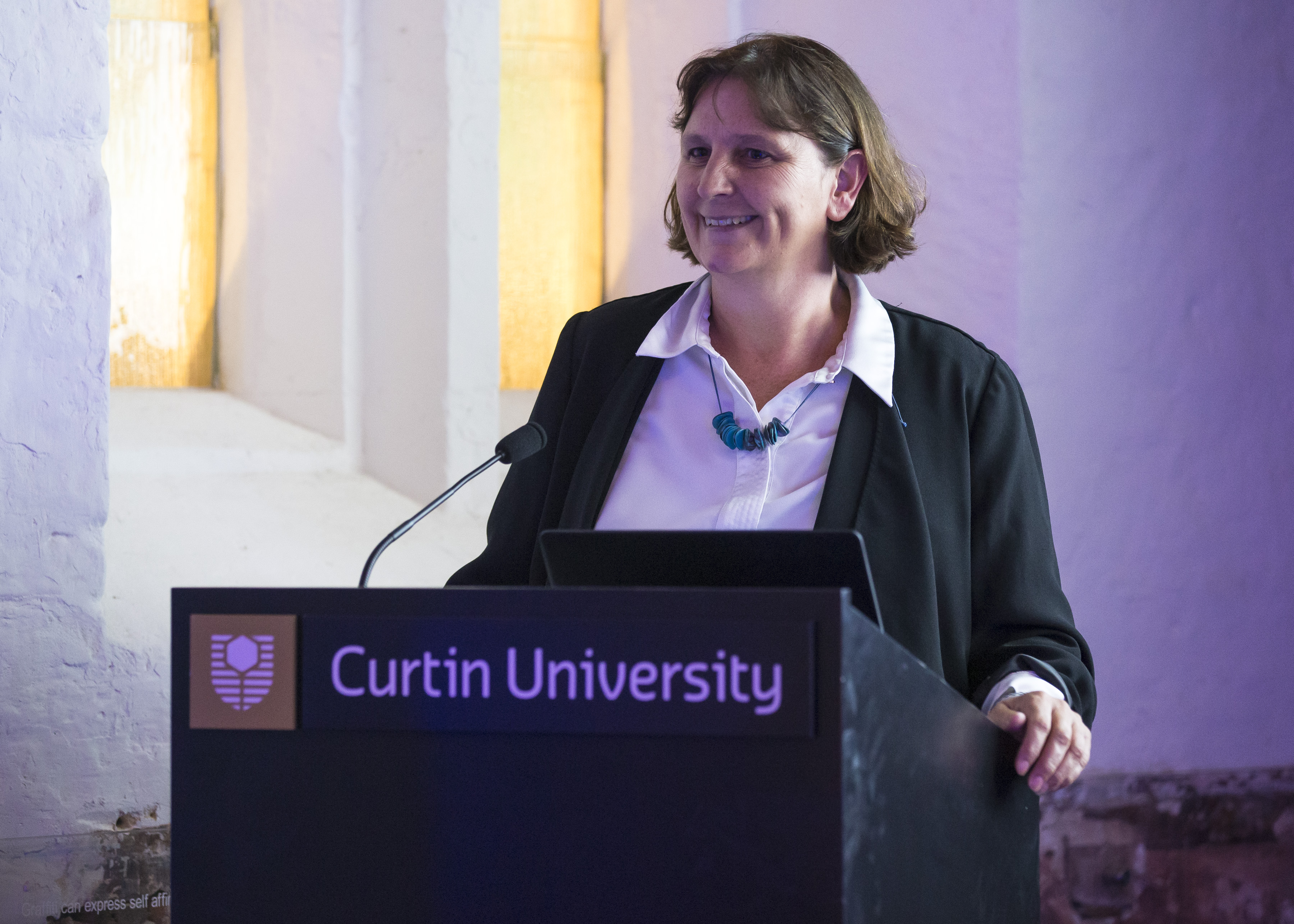
- Parker in 2018
- Born: Australia
- Education: The University of Sheffield (PhD); The University of Western Australia (BSc (Hons))
- Awards: Kathleen Fitzpatrick Australian Laureate Fellowship (2016); Academy of Management Organizational Behaviour Division Mentoring Award (2016)
- Scientific career
- Fields: Work design Organizational behaviour Industrial and organizational psychology Training and development Organizational change Proactivity; Mental health Job performance
- Workplaces: The Centre for Transformative Work Design (2016–present); Curtin University (2018–present); CEPAR (2018–present); Academy of Management Annals (2016–present); University of Western Australia (2011–2015); Journal of Applied Psychology (2008–2013); University of Sheffield (2006–2009); University of New South Wales (1999–2006)
- Thesis: Towards a new approach to job design research within modern manufacturing: The investigation of employee work orientations (1994)

Sharon Kaye Parker FASSA is an Australian academic and John Curtin Distinguished Professor in organisational behaviour at Curtin University. Parker is best known for her research in the field of work design, as well as other topics such as proactivity, mental health and job performance. She is a Fellow of the Academy of the Social Sciences in Australia, a Fellow of the Society for Industrial and Organisational Psychology, and in 2016 received the Kathleen Fitzpatrick Australian Laureate Fellowship. Parker's research has been cited over 51,000 times internationally and she has been recognised as one of the world's most influential scientists in the 2019 Highly Cited Researchers list by Clarivate, as well as the 2020 World's Top 2% Scientists list by Stanford University.

Parker is currently the Director of the Centre for Transformative Work Design within the Future of Work Institute at the Curtin Business School at Curtin University. Additionally, she is the Chief Investigator of the Organisations & Mature Workforce stream of the ARC Centre of Excellence in Population Ageing Research (CEPAR). She has served on numerous editorial boards and is a former Associate Editor for the Academy of Management Annals and the Journal of Applied Psychology.

Parker is the co-founder of the Thrive at Work initiative designed to improve mental health at work. She has also published articles in the Harvard Business Review, The Conversation, and other practitioner outlets and has contributed to various government inquiries and policy reviews. Parker was the lead consultant on the national Good Work Design initiative, SafeWork Australia, and is a member of the National Mental Health Commission National Workplace initiative. She established the Women in Research initiative to support academic women.

== Awards and honours ==
- 2013: Elected Fellow of the Society for Industrial and Organizational Psychology
- 2014: Elected Fellow of the Academy of Social Sciences in Australia
- 2016: Academy of Management Organizational Behaviour Division Mentoring Award
- 2016: Australian Laureate Fellowship (Kathleen Fitzpatrick Award)
- 2019: Web of Science Highly Cited Researcher 2019 (top 0.1% in the category of "Economics and Business")
- 2020: Ranked #119 in Stanford University's World's Top 2% Scientists List in the sub-area "Business and Management".

== Notable publications ==
- Parker, S. K., Chmiel, N., & Wall, T. D. (1997). Work characteristics and employee well-being within a context of strategic downsizing. Journal of Occupational Health Psychology, 2(4), 289. https://doi.org/10.1037/1076-8998.2.4.289
- Parker, S. K., Wall, T. D., & Jackson, P. R. (1997). "That's not my job": Developing flexible employee work orientations. Academy of Management Journal, 40(4), 899–929. https://doi.org/10.5465/256952
- Parker, S. K. (1998). Enhancing role breadth self-efficacy: The roles of job enrichment and other organizational interventions. Journal of Applied Psychology, 83(6), 835–852. https://doi.org/10.1037/0021-9010.83.6.835
- Parker, S. K., & Wall, T. D. (1998). Job and work design: Organizing work to promote well-being and effectiveness. Sage.
- Parker, S. K., & Sprigg, C. A. (1999). Minimizing strain and maximizing learning: The role of job demands, job control, and proactive personality. Journal of Applied Psychology, 84(6), 925. https://doi.org/10.1037/0021-9010.84.6.925
- Parker, S. K. (2000). From passive to proactive motivation: The importance of flexible role orientations and role breadth self‐efficacy. Applied Psychology, 49(3), 447–469. https://doi.org/10.1111/1464-0597.00025
- Parker, S. K., & Axtell, C. M. (2001). Seeing another viewpoint: Antecedents and outcomes of employee perspective taking. Academy of Management Journal, 44(6), 1085–1100. https://doi.org/10.5465/3069390
- Parker, S. K., Axtell, C. M., & Turner, N. (2001). Designing a safer workplace: Importance of job autonomy, communication quality, and supportive supervisors. Journal of Occupational Health Psychology, 6(3), 211. https://doi.org/10.1037/1076-8998.6.3.211
- Parker, S. K., Wall, T. D., & Cordery, J. L. (2001). Future work design research and practice: Towards an elaborated model of work design. Journal of Occupational and Organizational Psychology, 74(4), 413–440. https://doi.org/10.1348/096317901167460
- Parker, S. K., Griffin, M. A., Sprigg, C. A., & Wall, T. D. (2002). Effect of temporary contracts on perceived work characteristics and job strain: A longitudinal study. Personnel Psychology, 55(3), 689–719. https://doi.org/10.1111/j.1744-6570.2002.tb00126.x
- Parker, S. K. (2003). Longitudinal effects of lean production on employee outcomes and the mediating role of work characteristics. Journal of Applied Psychology, 88(4), 620–634. https://doi.org/10.1037/0021-9010.88.4.620
- Parker, S. K., Williams, H. M., & Turner, N. (2006). Modeling the antecedents of proactive behavior at work. Journal of Applied Psychology, 91(3), 636. https://doi.org/10.1037/0021-9010.91.3.636
- Parker, S. K., Bindl, U. K., & Strauss, K. (2010). Making things happen: A model of proactive motivation. Journal of Management, 36(4), 827–856. https://doi.org/10.1177/0149206310363732
- Parker, S. K. (2014). Beyond motivation: Job and work design for development, health, ambidexterity, and more. Annual Review of Psychology, 65. https://doi.org/10.1146/annurev-psych-010213-115208
- Parker, S. K., Morgeson, F. P., & Johns, G. (2017). One hundred years of work design research: Looking back and looking forward. Journal of Applied Psychology, 102(3), 403. https://doi.org/10.1037/apl0000106
- Parker, S. K., Andrei, D. M., & Van den Broeck, A. (2019). Poor work design begets poor work design: Capacity and willingness antecedents of individual work design behavior. Journal of Applied Psychology, 104(7), 907–928. https://doi.org/10.1037/apl0000383
- Parker, S. K., & Grote, G. (2020). Automation, algorithms, and beyond: Why work design matters more than ever in a digital world. Applied Psychology. https://doi.org/10.1111/apps.12241
- Parker, S. K., & Jorritsma, K. (2020). Good work design for all: Multiple pathways to making a difference. European Journal of Work and Organizational Psychology, 1-13. https://doi.org/10.1080/1359432X.2020.1860121
- Parker, S., Ward, M. K., & Fisher, G. (2021). Can High-Quality Jobs Help Workers Learn New Tricks? A Multi-Disciplinary Review of Work Design For Cognition. Academy of Management Annals. https://doi.org/10.5465/annals.2019.0057
