= Job crafting =

Individually-driven work design process

Job crafting is an individually-driven work design process which refers to self-initiated, proactive strategies to change the characteristics of one's job to better align the job with personal needs, goals, and skills. Individuals engage in job crafting as a means to experience greater meaning at work, a positive work identity, better work-related well-being, and better job performance. As a topic of scientific inquiry, job crafting was built on research that suggests employees do not always enact the job descriptions that are formally assigned to them, but instead actively shape and utilize their jobs to fit their needs, values, and preferences. Classic job design theory typically focuses on the ways in which managers design jobs for their employees. As a work design strategy, job crafting represents a departure from this thinking in that the redesign is driven by employees, is not negotiated with the employer and may not even be noticed by the manager. This idea also distinguishes job crafting from other 'bottom-up' redesign approaches such as idiosyncratic ideals (i-deals) which explicitly involve negotiation between the employee and employer.

== Theoretical background ==
The term 'job crafting' was originally coined by Amy Wrzesniewski and Jane E. Dutton in 2001, however the idea that employees may redesign their jobs without the involvement of management has been present in job design literature since 1987. Wrzesniewski and Dutton's (2001) initial definition limited job crafting to three forms: Changes made by employees in their jobs tasks (i.e. task crafting), job relationships (i.e. relational crafting), and meaning of the job (i.e. cognitive crafting). More recent developments have indicated that employees may change other aspects of the job; to cover this broader scope, Maria Tims and Arnold B. Bakker proposed in 2010 that job crafting be framed within the job-demands resources (JD-R) model.

Recent theoretical developments have classified job crafting behaviours into two higher-order constructs: Approach crafting, which refers to self-directed actions to gain positive work aspects; and avoidance crafting, which refers to self-directed actions to avoid negative work aspects. These two constructs can then be further differentiated depending on whether the job crafting is behavioural (i.e. the individual makes actual changes to the job) or cognitive (i.e. the individual changes the way they think about the work). Further differentiating can then be made depending on whether individuals change their job resources or job demands, resulting in eight 'types' of job crafting (e.g., approach behavioural resource crafting).

== Forms of job crafting ==
- Task crafting — This involves changing the type, scope, sequence, and number of tasks that make up one's job. Employees may take initiative to change the tasks they carry out, change the way they work, or change the timing of their tasks. In doing so, employees exert a level of control over their work, which has been shown to minimize negative feelings (e.g., alienation).
- Relational crafting — This refers to changing the nature of interactions at work. For example, employees may choose to what extent and how they approach colleagues, or to what extent they get involved in work group social activities.
- Cognitive crafting — This involves an modifying one's perceptions about their job to ascribe more meaning to the work. For example, an employee might continuously re-evaluate how work influences them and how connected they are to the work. This could involve considering observations at work and evaluating how well those observations align with personal goals, ideals, and passions.

== Practical implications ==
=== For employees ===
If enacted properly, job crafting is a method for employees to improve their quality of life at work in several important ways, as well as make valuable contributions to the workplace. The uniqueness of individual workers makes it exceptionally difficult for organizations to create 'one size fits all' work designs. Job crafting means that work designs are not fixed, and can be adapted over time to accommodate employees' unique backgrounds, motives, and preferences. The success of a job crafter may depend largely on their ability to take advantage of available resources (i.e. people, technology, raw materials etc) to reorganise, restructure, and reframe a job. Research has demonstrated that this type of resourcefulness can help employees get more enjoyment and meaning out of work, enhance their work identities, cope with adversity, and perform better.

=== For managers ===
Job crafting has the potential to positively influence both individual and organizational performance, meaning it is in the interest of managers to create a context that facilitates resourceful job crafting. Highly prescribed, restrictive job designs may limit employees from making positive changes in the way they perform tasks, taking on additional tasks, altering interactions with others, or viewing their jobs in an alternative way. On the other hand, job crafting that is beneficial for the job crafter may be harmful to the goals of the organization and produce negative effects. Therefore, in addition to allowing room for crafting, managers must build a shared understanding with employees that job crafting is encouraged so long as it aligns with the organizations overall strategy. Maintaining open lines of communication between managers and employees and building trust may promote positive job crafting which is favourable to both the individual crafter and the organization.

== Terminology ==
In human resources, quiet thriving refers to employees who actively craft their job in order to stay engaged and improve their mental state. Quiet thriving provides employees with a sense of agency that builds resilience and allows employees to find purpose in their roles and reduces occupational burnout. Quiet thriving may lead to additional career opportunities.

Motivated employees within dysfunctional organizations with poor leadership often opt to take initiative through quiet thriving instead of quiet quitting.

The term was coined by Lesley Alderman, a New York City-based psychotherapist, in a December 2022 Washington Post article in response to quiet quitting.
