= Incrementalism =

Adding to a project via many small changes instead of fewer large changes

In politics, the term "incrementalism" is also used as a synonym for Gradualism.

Incrementalism is a method of working by adding to or subtracting from a project using many small incremental changes instead of a few (extensively planned) large jumps. Logical incrementalism implies that the steps in the process are sensible. Logical incrementalism focuses on "the Power-Behavioral Approach to planning rather than to the Formal Systems Planning Approach". In public policy, incrementalism is the method of change by which many small policy changes are enacted over time in order to create a larger broad based policy change. Political scientist Charles E. Lindblom developed this theoretical policy of rationality in the 1950s as a middle way between the rational actor model and bounded rationality, as both long term, goal-driven policy rationality and satisficing were not seen as adequate.

== Origin ==
Most people use incrementalism without ever needing a name for it because it is the natural and intuitive way to tackle everyday problems, such as making coffee or getting dressed. These actions normally do not require extensive planning and problems can be dealt with one at a time as they arise.

Even in processes that involve more extensive planning, incrementalism is often an important tactic for dealing reactively with small details. For example, one might plan a route for a driving trip on a map, but one would not typically plan in advance where to change lanes or how long to stop at each traffic light.

Lindblom's essay “The Science of Muddling Through” (1959) helped policymakers understand why they needed to consider a different approach when making policy changes. The goal for the new perspective of incrementalism was for policy makers to avoid making changes before they really engaged and rationally thought through the issue.

== Contrasts to other planning methodologies ==
In large projects following some type of strategic planning, there is normally a need to allocate time to plan the project in order to avoid "fire fighting", in other words the avoidance of time delaying issues. In contrast to other systems of planning such as top down, bottom up, and so on, incrementalism involves concentrating on dealing with the immediate problems as they arrive and avoiding trying to create an overall strategic plan. This means muddling through the issues at hand based on importance.

Strategic implementation is a very well thought out plan of implementation that is the opposite to incrementalism. Although the plan involved with the strategic implementation might work incrementally it has set objectives at set times with little to no intention of muddling through the process. In other words, every part of the implementation would be expected and planned for ahead of time.

The antithesis of incrementalism is that work must be accomplished in one single push rather than through a process of continuous improvement. All work must be planned, only presented when complete and work in progress must be hidden.

In political science, research on incrementalism has largely been incorporated into the study of Punctuated equilibrium in social theory, which views policy change as periods of incremental improvement punctuated by major policy shifts.

== Advantages ==
The advantages of incrementalism over other formal systems is that no time is wasted planning for outcomes which may not occur.

- Politically expedient: Since it does not involve any radical and complete changes, it is easily accepted and therefore the process is expedient.
- Simplicity: it is very simple to understand. Compared to some of the other budgeting methods used in business, it is one of the easiest to put in practice, since one does not have to be an accountant or have much experience in business to use this form of budgeting.
- Gradual change: a very stable budget exists from one period to the next and allows for gradual change within the company. Many managers are intimidated by large budget increases from one period to the next. This type of budget will not cause that problem because it is based on the previous period's budget.
- Flexibility: it is very flexible. Doing it from one month to the next allows one to see change very quickly when a new policy or budget is implemented.
- Avoiding conflict: companies with many different departments often run into conflict between departments because of their different budgets. With this method of budgeting, it is easier to keep everyone on the same page and avoid conflicts between departments.

== Disadvantages ==
Disadvantages are that time may be wasted dealing with the immediate problems and no overall strategy is developed. Incrementalism in the study of rationality can be seen as a stealthy way to bring about radical changes that were not initially intended, a slippery slope.

- Beagle Fallacy: A beagle hound has a very good sense of smell but limited eyesight, and thus could miss prey that appears in front of but downwind. Likewise, by only focusing on incremental changes to policies and policy applications, organisations are in danger of missing the broader directions in fulfilling their mandate. Beagle fallacy is the primary criticism of incrementalism.
- Failure to account for change: it is based on the idea that expenses will run much as they did before. However, in business, that is rarely the case, and there are always variables.
- Absence of incentives: such a simple method of budgeting really does not provide employees with much reason to be creative. They have no incentive to innovate and come up with new ideas or policies since everything is limited.
- "Use it or lose it" perspective: Many employees view this as a "use it or lose it" system and know that next year's budget is going to be incrementally based on this year's. Therefore, if they do not spend everything that is allocated to them, they may not have enough money to work with next year. That creates an environment where waste is encouraged.

== Criticisms ==
Throughout Lindblom's career, there were many critics of incrementalism. Many believed that doing better meant moving past incrementalism, taking bigger steps in policy. Critics no longer wanted to muddle through, but to deal with the issues as a whole. Critics also wanted complete analysis of policy alternatives, while incrementalism only touches on this analysis.

== Usage ==
Incrementalism is commonly employed in politics, engineering, software design, planning and industry. Whereas it is often criticized as "fire fighting", the progressive improvement of product designs characteristic, e.g., of Japanese engineering, can create steadily improving product performance, which in certain circumstances outperforms more orthodox planning systems.

Another example would be in small changes that make way for a bigger overall change to get past unnoticed. A series of small steps toward an agenda would be less likely to be questioned than a large and swift change. An example could be the rise of gas prices, the company would only raise the price by a few cents every day, instead of a large change to a target price overnight. More people would notice and dispute a dramatic, 10% increase overnight, while a 10% increase over a span of a week would less likely be even noticed, let alone argued. This can be applied in many different ways, such as, economics, politics, a person's appearance, or laws.

=== Examples ===
In the 1970s, many countries decided to invest in wind energy. Denmark, a small country of around 5 million people, became a world leader in this technology using an incremental approach, while more formal design processes in the US, Germany and the United Kingdom failed to develop competitive machines. The reason for the difference of approach was that the Danish wind industry developed from an agricultural base, while the American and UK wind industries were based on hi-tech aerospace companies with significant university involvement. While the Danes built better and better windmills using an incremental approach, those using formal planning techniques believed that they could easily design a superior windmill straight away.

In practice, however, windmill design is not very complicated and the biggest problem is the tradeoff between cost and reliability. Although the UK and US designs were technically superior, the lack of experience in the field meant that their machines were less reliable. In contrast, the heavy agricultural windmills produced by the Danes just kept turning, and by 2000 the top three windmill manufacturers in the world were Danish.

The Central Arizona Project and the Salt River Project display the use of Innovation and incrementalism. There was a Plan 6 cost-sharing program that was a component in both of these projects and displayed innovations of the external enforcers and internal entrepreneurs and how they muddled through as well as collaborated incrementally to work on these projects with many different players in the mix.

Resource allocation by local authorities involves political negotiation and often follows incremental patterns when setting priorities. ] The annual United States federal budget process provides an example of incremental change through negotiations among politicians. Each year the budget allocates funds to agencies such as the Department of Defense and to programs including Social Security and Medicare, with amounts typically adjusted gradually according to shifting priorities and assessments of performance.

The annual United States federal budget process provides an example of incremental change through negotiations among politicians. Each year the budget allocates funds to agencies such as the Department of Defense and to programs including Social Security and Medicare, with amounts typically adjusted gradually according to shifting priorities and assessments of performance.

== Related concepts ==
Incrementalism is a planning methodology normally found where a large strategic plan is either unnecessary or has failed to develop and for that reason it is often just called "muddling through". Incrementalism is the antithesis of intrusive central planning, which can create rigid work systems unable to deal with the actual problems faced at the grassroots level. However, without a central planning framework incremental working is difficult to support within structured systems and therefore requires a degree of self-reliance, skills and experience of those dealing with the problems such as is found in autonomous work groups.

== See also ==
- Adaptation
- Critical juncture theory
- Heuristics
- Methodology
- Conventional wisdom
- Ipso facto
- Maladaptation
- Organization theory
- Rationality
- Gradualism
