= Autonomous work group =

In business management, an autonomous work group is a group encouraged to manage its own work and working practices.

== Definition ==
A. Rao, N. Thorberry and J. Weintraub define autonomous teamwork as "groups of independent workers, who regulate much of their own task behaviour around relatively whole tasks. This kind of groups are also generally allowed to select and train new members, set their own work pace, supervise most of their own activities and often trade jobs among themselves"

We can distinguish semi-autonomous and autonomous teams. The difference is the degree of autonomy of the group.

Nowadays, more and more companies are employing (semi-) autonomous work groups, such as companies in the automobile industry, mass distribution sector, and start-ups.

To succeed and perform its tasks, a (semi-) autonomous team needs:

- Communication and coordination: team members have to transmit all the information to each other in a common language; good coordination between team members permits them to obtain information when needed and move easily from one task to another;
- Cohesion: brings the team stability, a feeling of unity, satisfaction, and permits members to respond positively to each other and to communicate well;
- Decision making and taking responsibility: to succeed, the team must collect information, discuss, evaluate alternatives and most importantly, decide collaboratively on the appropriate course of action.

== Autonomous Teamwork and Psychological Well-being ==
There is an ongoing phenomenon that autonomous teamwork supposedly has a positive influence on the psychological well-being of employees.

A study conducted by two universities in The Netherlands focuses on the influences of the perceived group autonomy and individual autonomy, respectively on the individual tasks and psychological well-being. A poll was conducted on employees in a supermarket chain, which targeted different aspects of team work, (i.e. individual autonomy, social relationships with colleagues or even individual workload). It was found that there is no strong relationship between psychological fatigue and individual task variety, also between motivation to learn and quality of social relationships.

There is still a positive impact of the individual aspects of the work on motivation. It shows indeed that autonomous work increases variety, decreases individual workload, and overall improves the quality of social relationships.

== See also ==
- Incrementalism
- Teamwork
- Input–process–output model of teams
- Team development
- Team composition
