= Human communication =

Human communication is a field of study dedicated to understanding how humans communicate. Human ability to communicate with one another would not be possible without an understanding of what we are referencing or thinking about. Because humans are unable to fully understand one another's perspective, there needs to be a creation of commonality through a shared mindset or viewpoint. The field of communication is very diverse, as there are multiple layers of what communication is and how we use its different features as human beings.

Humans have communicatory abilities other animals do not. For example, humans are able to communicate about time and place as though they are solid objects. Humans communicate to request help, inform others, and share attitudes for bonding. Communication is a joint activity largely dependent on the ability to maintain common attention. We share relevant background knowledge and joint experience in order to communicate content and coherence in exchanges. Most face-to-face communication requires visually reading and following along with the other person, offering gestures in reply, and maintaining eye contact throughout the interaction.

== Category ==
The current study of human communication can be branched off into two major categories; rhetorical and relational. The focus of rhetorical communication is primarily on the study of influence; the art of rhetorical communication is based on the idea of persuasion. The relational approach examines communication from a transactional perspective; two or more people interact to reach an agreed perspective.

In its early stages, rhetoric was developed to help ordinary people prove their claims in court; this shows how persuasion is key in this form of communication. Aristotle stated that effective rhetoric is based on argumentation. As explained in the text, rhetoric involves a dominant party and a submissive party or a party that succumbs to that of the most dominant party. While the rhetorical approach stems from Western societies, the relational approach stems from Eastern societies. Eastern societies hold higher standards for cooperation, which makes sense as to why they would sway more toward a relational approach for that matter. "Maintaining valued relationships is generally seen as more important than exerting influence and control over others". "The study of human communication today is more diversified than ever before in its history".

Classification of human communication can be found in the workplace, especially for group work. Co-workers need to argue with each other to gain the best solutions for their projects, while they also need to nurture their relationships to maintain their collaboration. For example, in their group work, they may use the communication tactic of "saving face".

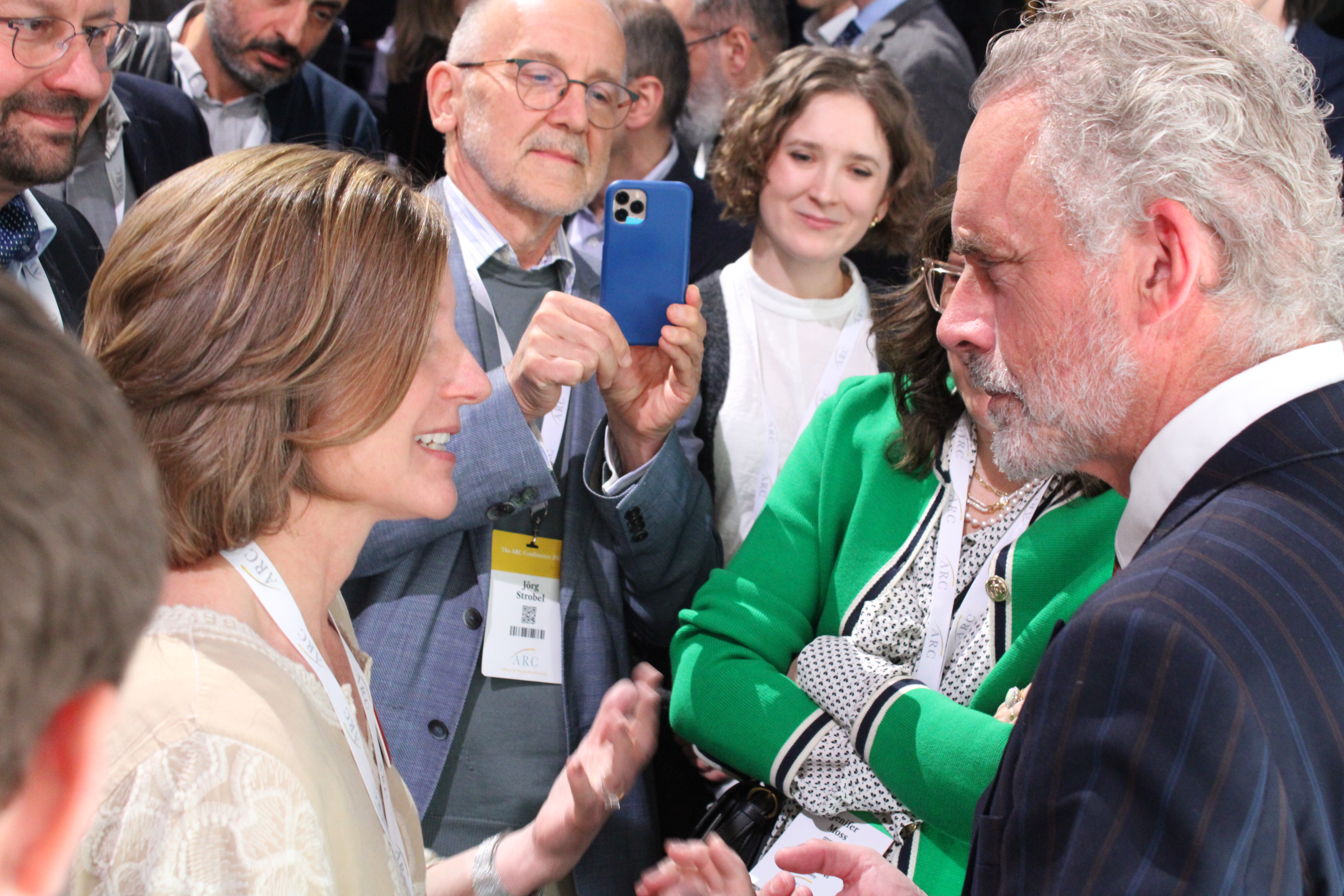
Oral communication between two persons, Kimberly Ells and Jordan Peterson, in 2025

Spoken language involves speech, a quality mostly unique to humans. For example, chimpanzees are humans' closest relatives, but they are unable to produce speech. Chimpanzees are closer to humans, in genetic and evolutionary terms, than they are to gorillas or other apes. The fact that a chimpanzee will not acquire speech, even when raised in a human home with all the environmental input of a normal human child, is one of the central puzzles we face when contemplating the biology of our species. In repeated experiments, starting in the 1910s, chimpanzees raised in close contact with humans have universally failed to speak, or even to try to speak, despite their rapid progress in many other intellectual and motor domains. Each normal human is born with a capacity to rapidly and unerringly acquire their mother tongue, with little explicit teaching or coaching. In contrast, no nonhuman primate has spontaneously produced even a word of the local language.

== Definition ==
Human communication can be defined as shared symbolic interaction.

- Shared, because each communication process also requires a system of signification (the Code) as its necessary condition, and if the encoding is not known to all those who are involved in the communication process, there is no understanding and therefore fails the same notification.
- Symbolic, because communication happens through the exchange of signs (the symbols one understands to signify a concept) forming what we know as verbal and non-verbal language.
- Interaction, since it involves two or more people, resulting in a further increase of knowledge on the part of all those who interact.

== Types ==
Human communication can be subdivided into a variety of types:

- Intrapersonal communication (communication with yourself): This very basic form of information, is the standard and foundation, of all things communication. This communication with ourselves showcases the process in which we think on our previous and ongoing actions, as well as what we choose to understand from other types of communications and events. Our intrapersonal communication, may be shown and expressed to others by our reactions to certain outcomes, through simple acts of gestures and expressions.
- Interpersonal communication (communication between two or more people) - Communication relies heavily on understanding the processes and situations that you are in, in order to communicate effectively. It is more than simple behaviors and strategies, on how and what it means to communicate with another person. Interpersonal communication reflects the personality and characteristics, of a person, seen through the type of dialect, form, and content, a person chooses to communicate with. As simple as this is, interpersonal communication can only be correctly done if both persons involved in the communication, understand what it is to be human beings, and share similar qualities of what it means to be humans. It involves acts of trust and openness, as well as a sense of respect and care towards what the other person is talking about.
  - Nonverbal communication: The messages we send to each other, in ways that cover the act of word-by-mouth. These actions may be done through the use of our facial features and expressions, arms and hands, the tone of our voice, or even our very appearance can display a certain type of message.
  - Speech: Allowing words to make for an understanding as to what people are feeling and expressing. It allows a person to get a direct thought out to another by using their voice to create words that then turn into a sentence, which in turn then turns into a conversation to get a message across. "What is spoken or expressed, as in conversation; uttered or written words: seditious speech. A talk or public address, or a written copy of this: The senator gave a speech. The language or dialect of a nation or region: American speech. One's manner or style of speaking: the mayor's mumbling speech. The study of oral communication, speech sounds, and vocal physiology".
  - Conversation: Allows however many people to say words back and forth to each other that will equal into a meaningful rhythm called conversation. It defines ideas between people, teams, or groups. To have a conversation requires at least two people, making it possible to share the values and interests of each person. Conversation makes it possible to get messages across to other people, whether that be an important message or just a simple message. "Strong conversation skills will virtually guarantee that you will be better understood by most people"
  - Visual communication: The type of communication where it involves using your eyes that allow you to read signs, charts, graphs, and pictures that have words or phrases and or pictures showing and describing what needs to be portrayed to get information across. Using visual communication allows for people to live daily lives without constantly needing to speak. A simple example is driving in a car and seeing a red sign that says "stop" on it; as a driver, you are using visual communication to read the sign understand what is being said and stop your car to not get into an accident. "If carried out properly, visual communication has various benefits. In the information era and fast-paced society in which time is limited, visual communication help to communicate ideas faster and better. Generally speaking, it offers these benefits: instant conveyance, ease of understanding, cross-cultural communication and generation of enjoyment".
  - Writing: Writing is the process of forming words and sentences to convey meaning. It involves arranging letters and symbols to communicate ideas in a readable form. Writing may be produced by hand or through typing on a computer and is commonly used to record information, express thoughts, and facilitate communication. “Writing” is the process of using symbols (letters of the alphabet, punctuation, and spaces) to communicate thoughts and ideas in a readable form.
  - Mail: This is in the form of postage which is in a letter or package. When someone uses the post office service requiring them to send a letter that they wrote with pencil and paper or they are using the postage service to send an object to someone out of state. Makes for an easier process to send a loved one messages or objects that do not live next to you or within a 20 min drive distance. "Material (such as letters and packages) sent or carried in a postal system". For an example a loved one is in the military and is out of state, to let them know what is going on in your life and to also ask how they are doing you send them a letter via the postal service to get that message to them at their location. Workers at the postal service get the letters and packages across states and countries.
  - Mass media: "The means of communication reaching a large number of people such as the population of a nation through certain channels like film, radio, books, music, or television in that the consumer participation stays passive with comparison to interactive network platforms". The television allows for getting messages to a lot of people in different locations in a matter of minutes making it for the fastest communication skill.
  - Telecommunication: A style of communication that allows humans to understand conversation, speech, and or visual communication through technology. Whether you are listening to the radio, using your eyes to watch television, or reading words in an email that is Telecommunication. This type of communication allows for a faster and more efficient process for a message to get across to another one from anywhere you are. Location is not a problem for this type of communication. "The transmission media in telecommunication have evolved through numerous stages of technology, from beacons and other visual signals (such as smoke signals, semaphore telegraphs, signal flags, and optical heliographs), to electrical cable and electromagnetic radiation, including light. Such transmission paths are often divided into communication channels, which afford the advantages of multiplexing multiple concurrent communication sessions. Telecommunication is often used in its plural form".
- Organizational communication (communication within organizations): Defined by structure and planning, making words, phrases, and images flow into direction and meaning. "The construct of organizational communication structure is defined by its 5 main dimensions: relationships, entities, contexts, configuration, and temporal stability". Making it easier to work into groups of different culture and thoughts.
- Mass communication: This type of communication involves the process of communicating with known and unknown audiences, through the use of technology or other mediums. There is hardly ever an opportunity for the audience to respond directly to those who sent the message, there is a divide/separation between the sender and receiver. There are typically four players in the process of mass communication, these players are those who send the message, the message itself, the medium in which the message is sent, and those who receive the message. These four components come together to be the communication we see and are a part of the most, as the media helps in distributing these messages to the world every day.
- Group dynamics (communication within groups): Allows ideas to be created within a group of people, allowing many minds to think together to form and create meaning. "The interactions that influence the attitudes and behavior of people when they are grouped with others through either choice or accidental circumstances".
- Cross-cultural communication (communication across cultures): This allows different people from different locations, gender, and culture, in a group to feed off of each other's ideas to form something much bigger and better. "Culture is a way of thinking and living whereby one picks up a set of attitudes, values, norms, and beliefs that are taught and reinforced by other members in the group".
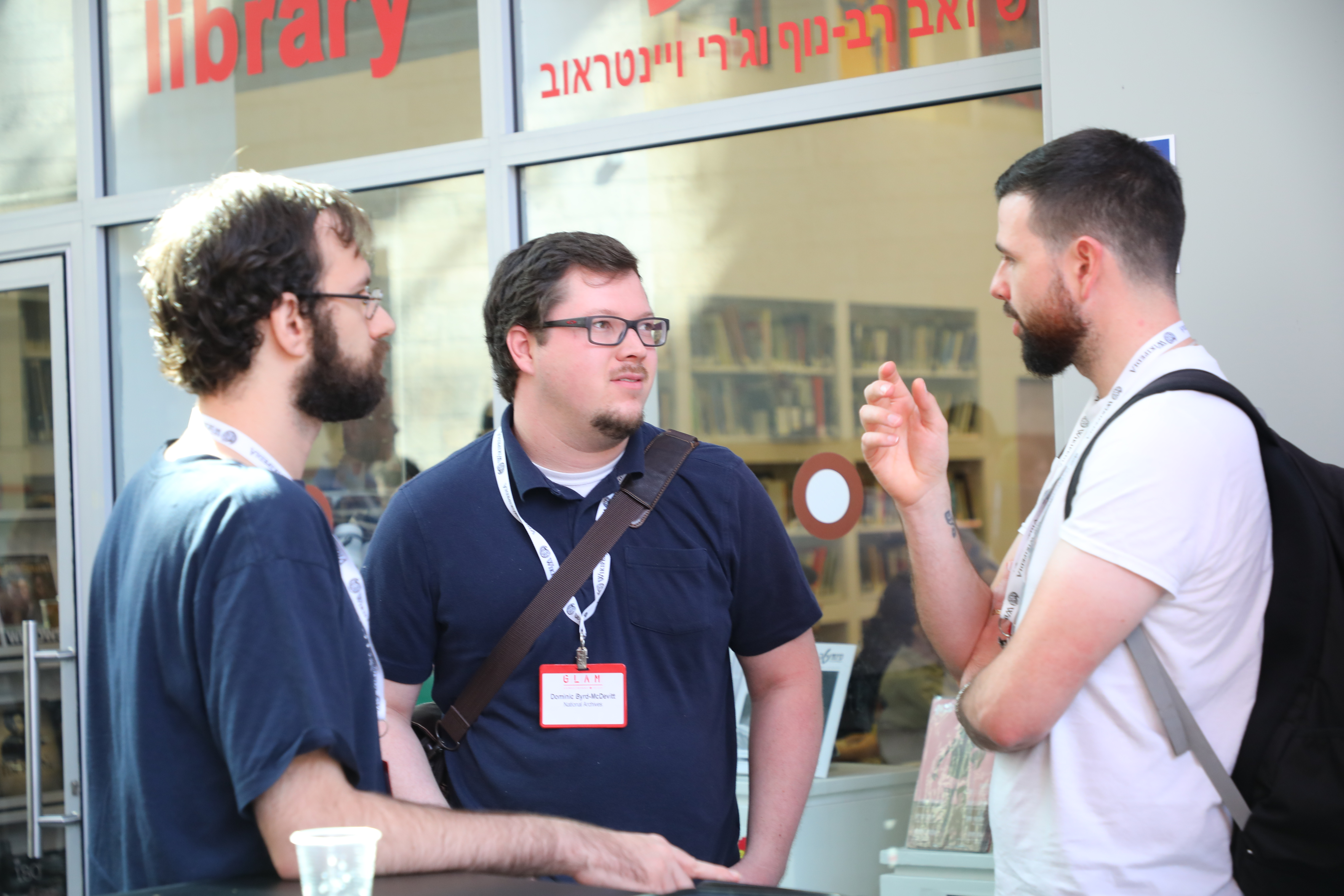
  Example of face-to-face interaction between three individuals

== Face-to-Face Interaction ==
Face-to-face interaction is social communication carried out with other present individuals without any mediating technology. It is defined as the mutual influence of individuals’ direct physical presence with their body language and verbal language. It is one of the basic elements of a social system, forming a significant part of socialization and experience throughout an individual's lifetime. It is also central to the development of groups and organizations composed of those individuals. Face-to-face interaction not only allows people to communicate more directly, but has been shown to improve mental health and can reduce various mental illnesses, most commonly, depression and anxiety.

=== Studies on Face-to-Face Interaction ===
Most research and studies on face-to-face interaction is done via direct observation; the goal is to explain the regularities in the actions observed in these interactions. The study of face-to-face interaction examines its organization, rules, and strategy. It has been of interest to scholars since at least the early 20th century. One of the earliest social science scholars to analyze this type of interaction was sociologist Georg Simmel. He defined a society as a number of individuals intertwined by various interactions. In his 1908 book, he observed that sensory organs play an important role in interaction, discussing examples of human behavior such as eye contact. His insights were soon developed by others, including Charles Cooley and George Herbert Mead. Their theories became known as symbolic interactionism; and have since opened the door to a variety and wide range of other theories. Symbolic interactionists are more concerned with subjective meaning rather than objective structure. They focus on how individuals interpret subjective meaning, which leads them to understand how that individual views the world as well as how the repetition of meaningful interactions among individuals is the groundwork to define the formation of society. By the mid-20th century, there was already a sizable scholarly literature on various aspects of face-to-face interaction. Works on this topic have been published by scholars such as Erving Goffman and Eliot Chapple.

=== Mediated Communication ===
Historically, mediated communication was much rarer than face-to-face. Even though humans have possessed the technology to communicate in space and time (e.g. writing) for millennia, the majority of the world's population lacked the necessary skills, such as literacy, to use them. This began to change with the invention of the printing press by Johannes Gutenberg that led to the spread of printed texts and rising literacy in Europe from the 15th century. Since then, face-to-face interaction has begun to steadily lose ground to mediated communication.

=== Compared with Mediated Communication ===
Face-to-face communication has been however described as less preferable to mediated communication in some situations, particularly where time and geographical distance are an issue. For example, in maintaining a long-distance friendship, face-to-face communication was only the fourth most common way of maintaining ties, after telephone, email, and instant messaging.

Despite the advent of many new information and communication technologies, face-to-face interaction is still widespread and popular and has a better performance in many different areas. Nardi and Whittaker (2002) pointed that face-to-face communication is still the golden standard among the mediated technologies based on many theorists, particularly in the context of the media richness theory where face-to-face communication is described as the most efficient and informational one. This is explained because face-to-face communication engages more human senses than mediated communication. Face-to-face interaction is also a useful way for people when they want to win over others based on verbal communication, or when they try to settle disagreements. Besides, it does help a lot for teachers as one effective teaching method. It is also easier to keep a stronger and more active political connection with others by face-to-face interaction.

In the end, there are both pros and cons to each form of communication. Several studies compared the two groups in order to determine the advantages and disadvantages of each. One group was communicating only through face-to-face communication, while the other was communicating only through computer-mediated communication. These studies found that computer-mediated groups perform better than face-to-face groups on idea generation tasks, while face-to-face groups excel in social emotional exchange. This is because face-to-face groups have more tension release and agreement statements, while computer-mediated groups have a tendency of giving more suggestions, opinions, and formal expressions. There is a greater equality of participation in computer-mediated groups, but there's also a higher rate of uninhibited behaviour because computer-mediated groups induce a greater loss of self-awareness. There is generally a reduced sense of social pressure in computer-mediated groups, but there is a stronger perception and sense of understanding in face-to-face groups.

=== Face-to-Face Interactions Versus Social Media ===
Talking to someone face to face gives a person non-verbal cues, such as smiling, physical movement, and body positions that help people communicate. However, since social media lacks face-to-face communication, some individuals have adapted to blind communication when speaking online, seen through texting, commenting, and sending/receiving messages.

By nature, humans are social. Social interaction is essential to survival. With recent advances in technology, such as the Internet, instant messaging, and smartphones, forms many channels and ways to interact with others. However, the human brain has evolved to adapt and keep up with this flood of mass communication. While face-to-face communication is predicted to improve quality of life, Internet and social media communication did not. The Internet opens a new realm of possibilities in connecting with people around the globe with inherent factors in online communication that limit its ability to promote the same level of social satisfaction as traditional face-to-face communication. There are significant differences between online and face-to-face communication, leading to online communication being less emotionally satisfying and fulfilling than face-to-face communication. Social interaction on the internet and through social media platforms makes the interaction considerably difficult to distinguish nonverbal cues. Transitive memory development is also brought by face-to-face communication, which is more effective than online communication.

While technology has been able to bring communities and people closer together, humans have a responsibility to cultivate those connections and nurture them through old-fashioned face-to-face communication.

=== Cross Multicultures ===
Although there are increasingly virtual communications in large transnational companies with the development of Internet, face-to-face interaction is still a crucial tool in communication between employees and staff workers. Face-to-face interaction is beneficial to understand underlying truths that are presented through emotion and body language, especially when there are language and cultural differences present amongst individuals.

Cooperation in a multicultural team requires knowledge sharing. Ambiguous knowledge which arises frequently in a multicultural team is inevitable because of the different language habits. Face-to-face communication is better than other virtual communications for the ambiguous information. The reason is that face-to-face communication can provide non-verbal messages including gestures, eye contact, touch, and body movement. However, the virtual communications, such as email, only have verbal information which will make team members more misunderstanding of the knowledge due to their different comprehension of the same words. On the other hand, the understanding of professional standards shows no difference between face-to-face interaction and virtual communications.

Van der Zwaard and Bannink (2014) examined the effect of video call compared with face-to-face communication on the negotiation of meaning between native speakers and non-native speakers of English. Face-to-face interaction provides individuals who use English as the second language both intentional and unintentional actions which could enhance the comprehension of the chat in English. Individuals are more honest in understanding when they are in face-to-face interaction than in video call due to the potential loss of face issues for the non-native language speakers during the video call. As a result, face-to-face interaction has a more positive influence on the negotiation of meaning than virtual communications such as the video call.

== Important figures ==
- Colin Cherry
- Jacques Derrida
- Wendell Johnson
- Marshall McLuhan
- Paul Watzlawick
- Albert Mehrabian
- Carl Rogers
- Norbert Wiener

== See also ==
- Cross-cultural communication – Field of study that looks at how people from differing cultural backgrounds communicate
- General semantics – School of thought on cognition and problem-solving
- History of communication
- Intercultural communication – Discipline that studies communication across different cultures and social groups
- Mass communication – Mass media information exchange
- Mass media – Forms of media that reach large audiences
- Outline of communication – Overview of and topical guide to communication
- Pragmatics – Branch of linguistics and semiotics relating context to meaning
- Proactive communications – Customer relationship strategy
