= Proactivity =

Self-initiated behavior pattern

Proactivity or proactive behavior refers to self-initiated behavior that endeavours to solve a problem before it has occurred. Proactive behavior involves acting in advance of a future situation, rather than reacting. It refers to taking control of a situation and making early changes, rather than adjusting to a situation or waiting for something to happen.

Reactivity, as a behaviour pattern, is a habitual mode of taking one's lead from the situation or a participant, rather than taking initiative to solve the problem on your own terms. In moderation, this can be an effective expression of social risk aversion. Taken to excess, reactivity is a form of disempowerment.

== History ==
The use of the word proactive (or pro-active) was limited to the domain of experimental psychology in the 1930s, and used with a different meaning. Oxford English Dictionary (OED) credits Paul Whiteley and Gerald Blankfort, citing their 1933 paper discussing proactive inhibition as the "impairment or retardation of learning or of the remembering of what is learned by effects that remain active from conditions prior to the learning".

== Proactive behaviour ==
Proactive behavior can be contrasted with other work-related behaviors, such as proficiency, i.e. the fulfillment of predictable requirements of one's job, or adaptability, the successful coping with and support of change initiated by others in the organization. In regard to the latter, whereas adaptability is about responding to change, proactivity is about initiating constructive change.

Proactivity is not restricted to extra role performance behaviors. Employees can be proactive in their prescribed role (e.g. by changing the way they perform a core task to be more efficient). Likewise, behaviors labeled as organizational citizenship behavior (OCB) can be carried out proactively or passively. For example, the altruistic OCB can be proactive in nature (e.g. offering help to co-workers before they ask for assistance). It aims at the identification and exploring of opportunities in taking action against the potential problems and threats.

== See also ==
- Journal of Applied Psychology
- Onboarding
- Personnel psychology
- Proactive communications
