= C-chart =

c-chart
- Originally proposed by: Walter A. Shewhart

Process observations
- Rational subgroup size: n > 1
- Measurement type: Number of nonconformances in a sample
- Quality characteristic type: Attributes data
- Underlying distribution: Poisson distribution

Performance
- Size of shift to detect: ≥ 1.5σ

Process variation chart
- Not applicable

Process mean chart
- Center line: $\bar c = \frac {\sum_{i=1}^m \sum_{j=1}^n \mbox{no. of defects for } x_{ij}}{m}$
- Control limits: $\bar c \pm 3\sqrt{\bar c}$
- Plotted statistic: $\bar c_i = \sum_{j=1}^n \mbox{no. of defects for } x_{ij}$

In statistical quality control, the c-chart is a type of control chart used to monitor "count"-type data, typically total number of nonconformities per unit. It is also occasionally used to monitor the total number of events occurring in a given unit of time.

The c-chart differs from the p-chart in that it accounts for the possibility of more than one nonconformity per inspection unit, and that (unlike the p-chart and u-chart) it requires a fixed sample size. The p-chart models "pass"/"fail"-type inspection only, while the c-chart (and u-chart) give the ability to distinguish between (for example) 2 items which fail inspection because of one fault each and the same two items failing inspection with 5 faults each; in the former case, the p-chart will show two non-conformant items, while the c-chart will show 10 faults.

Nonconformities may also be tracked by type or location which can prove helpful in tracking down assignable causes.

Examples of processes suitable for monitoring with a c-chart include:

- Monitoring the number of voids per inspection unit in injection molding or casting processes
- Monitoring the number of discrete components that must be re-soldered per printed circuit board
- Monitoring the number of product returns per day

The Poisson distribution is the basis for the chart and requires the following assumptions:

- The number of opportunities or potential locations for nonconformities is very large
- The probability of nonconformity at any location is small and constant
- The inspection procedure is same for each sample and is carried out consistently from sample to sample

The control limits for this chart type are $\bar c \pm 3\sqrt{\bar c}$ where $\bar c$ is the estimate of the long-term process mean established during control-chart setup.

== See also ==
- u-chart
