= Np-chart =

np-chart
- Originally proposed by: Walter A. Shewhart

Process observations
- Rational subgroup size: n > 1
- Measurement type: Number nonconforming per unit
- Quality characteristic type: Attributes data
- Underlying distribution: Binomial distribution

Performance
- Size of shift to detect: ≥ 1.5σ

Process variation chart
- Not applicable

Process mean chart
- Center line: $$n \bar p = \frac {\sum_{i=1}^m \sum_{j=1}^n \begin{cases} 1 & \mbox{if }x_{ij}\mbox{ defective} \\ 0 & \mbox{otherwise} \end{cases}}{m}$$
- Control limits: $n \bar p \pm 3\sqrt{n \bar p(1- \bar p)}$
- Plotted statistic: $$n \bar p_i = \sum_{j=1}^n \begin{cases} 1 & \mbox{if }x_{ij}\mbox{ defective} \\ 0 & \mbox{otherwise} \end{cases}$$

In statistical quality control, the np-chart is a type of control chart used to monitor the number of nonconforming units in a sample. It is an adaptation of the p-chart and used in situations where personnel find it easier to interpret process performance in terms of concrete numbers of units rather than the somewhat more abstract proportion.

The np-chart differs from the p-chart in only the three following aspects:

1. The control limits are $n\bar p \pm 3\sqrt{n\bar p(1-\bar p)}$, where n is the sample size and $\bar p$ is the estimate of the long-term process mean established during control-chart setup.
2. The number nonconforming (np), rather than the fraction nonconforming (p), is plotted against the control limits.
3. The sample size, $n$, is constant.

== See also ==
- p-chart
