= EWMA chart =

Type of control chart in statistical quality control

- Originally proposed by: S. W. Roberts

Process observations
- Rational subgroup size: n = 1
- Measurement type: Moving average of the quality characteristic
- Quality characteristic type: Variables data
- Underlying distribution: Normal distribution

Performance
- Size of shift to detect: ≤ 1.5σ

Process variation chart
- Not applicable

Process mean chart
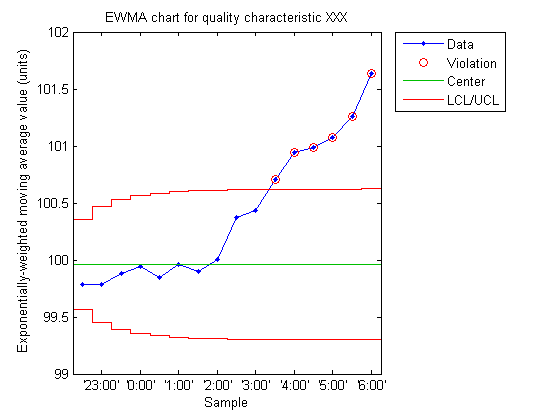
- Center line: The target value, T, of the quality characteristic
- Control limits: $T \pm L\frac {S}{\sqrt n}\sqrt{\frac{\lambda}{2 - \lambda}\lbrack 1 - \left ( 1 - \lambda \right )^{2i} \rbrack}$
- Plotted statistic: $z_i = \lambda \bar x_i + \left ( 1 - \lambda \right)z_{i - 1}$

In statistical quality control, an EWMA chart (or exponentially weighted moving average chart) is a type of control chart used to monitor either variables or attributes-type data using the monitored business or industrial process's entire history of output. While other control charts treat rational subgroups of samples individually, the EWMA chart tracks the exponentially-weighted moving average of all prior sample means. EWMA weights samples in geometrically decreasing order so that the most recent samples are weighted most highly while the most distant samples contribute very little.

Although the normal distribution is the basis of the EWMA chart, the chart is also relatively robust in the face of non-normally distributed quality characteristics. There is, however, an adaptation of the chart that accounts for quality characteristics that are better modeled by the Poisson distribution. The chart monitors only the process mean; monitoring the process variability requires the use of some other technique.

The EWMA control chart requires a knowledgeable person to select two parameters before setup:

1. The first parameter is λ, the weight given to the most recent rational subgroup mean. λ must satisfy 0 < λ ≤ 1, but selecting the "right" value is a matter of personal preference and experience. One 2005 textbook recommends 0.05 ≤ λ ≤ 0.25, while a 1986 journal article recommends 0.1 ≤ λ ≤ 0.3.
2. The second parameter is L, the multiple of the rational subgroup standard deviation that establishes the control limits. L is typically set at 3 to match other control charts, but it may be necessary to reduce L slightly for small values of λ.

Instead of plotting rational subgroup averages directly, the EWMA chart computes successive observations z_{i} by computing the rational subgroup average, $\bar x_i$, and then combining that new subgroup average with the running average of all preceding observations, z_{i - 1}, using the specially–chosen weight, λ, as follows:

$$z_i = \lambda \bar x_i + \left ( 1 - \lambda \right)z_{i - 1}$$.

The control limits for this chart type are $T \pm L\frac {S}{\sqrt n}\sqrt{\frac{\lambda}{2 - \lambda}\lbrack 1 - \left ( 1 - \lambda \right )^{2i} \rbrack}$ where T and S are the estimates of the long-term process mean and standard deviation established during control-chart setup and n is the number of samples in the rational subgroup. Note that the limits widen for each successive rational subgroup, approaching $\pm L\frac {\hat \sigma}{\sqrt n}\sqrt{\frac{\lambda}{2-\lambda}}$.

The EWMA chart is sensitive to small shifts in the process mean, but does not match the ability of Shewhart-style charts (namely the $\bar x$ and R and $\bar x$ and s charts) to detect larger shifts. One author recommends superimposing the EWMA chart on top of a suitable Shewhart-style chart with widened control limits in order to detect both small and large shifts in the process mean.

Exponentially weighted moving variance (EWMVar) can be used to obtain a significance score or limits that automatically adjust to the observed data.
