= X-bar chart =

Statistical chart of arithmetic means

In industrial statistics, the X-bar chart is a type of variable control chart that is used to monitor the arithmetic means of successive samples of constant size, n. This type of control chart is used for characteristics that can be measured on a continuous scale, such as weight, temperature, thickness etc. For example, one might take a sample of 5 shafts from production every hour, measure the diameter of each, and then plot, for each sample, the average of the five diameter values on the chart.

For the purposes of control limit calculation, the sample means are assumed to be normally distributed, an assumption justified by the Central Limit Theorem.

The X-bar chart is always used in conjunction with a variation chart such as the $\bar x$ and R chart or $\bar x$ and s chart. The R-chart shows sample ranges (difference between the largest and the smallest values in the sample), while the s-chart shows the samples' standard deviation. The R-chart was preferred in times when calculations were performed manually, as the range is far easier to calculate than the standard deviation; with the advent of computers, ease of calculation ceased to be an issue, and the s-chart is preferred these days, as it is statistically more meaningful and efficient. Depending on the type of variation chart used, the average sample range or the average sample standard deviation is used to derive the X-bar chart's control limits.
