= CQA =

CQA may refer to:

- CQA Four Mile Bridge, in Hot Springs County, Wyoming
- Caffeoylquinic acid, the name of various acids
- Certified Quality Auditor, a professional auditor certification
- Columbia Queer Alliance, a Columbia University student organization
- Community question-answering, in social information seeking
- Critical quality attributes, a term from pharmaceutical manufacturing
