= U-chart =

Type of control chart

u-chart
- Originally proposed by: Walter A. Shewhart

Process observations
- Rational subgroup size: n > 1
- Measurement type: Number of nonconformances per unit
- Quality characteristic type: Attributes data
- Underlying distribution: Poisson distribution

Performance
- Size of shift to detect: ≥ 1.5σ

Process variation chart
- Not applicable

Process mean chart
- Center line: $\bar u = \frac {\sum_{i=1}^m \sum_{j=1}^n \mbox{no. of defects for } x_{ij}}{mn}$
- Control limits: $\bar u \pm 3\sqrt{\frac {\bar u}{n_i}}$
- Plotted statistic: $\bar u_i = \frac {\sum_{j=1}^n \mbox{no. of defects for } x_{ij}}{n}$

In statistical quality control, a u-chart is a type of control chart used to monitor "count"-type data where the sample size is greater than one, typically the average number of nonconformities per unit.

The u-chart differs from the c-chart in that it accounts for the possibility that the number or size of inspection units for which nonconformities are to be counted may vary. Larger samples may be an economic necessity or may be necessary to increase the area of opportunity in order to track very low nonconformity levels.

Examples of processes suitable for monitoring with a u-chart include:

- Monitoring the number of nonconformities per lot of raw material received where the lot size varies
- Monitoring the number of new infections in a hospital per day
- Monitoring the number of accidents for delivery trucks per day

As with the c-chart, the Poisson distribution is the basis for the chart and requires the same assumptions.

The control limits for this chart type are $\bar u \pm 3\sqrt{\frac{\bar u}{n_i}}$ where $\bar u$ is the estimate of the long-term process mean established during control-chart setup. The observations $u_i = \frac{x_i}{n_i}$ are plotted against these control limits, where x_{i} is the number of nonconformities for the ith subgroup and n_{i} is the number of inspection units in the ith subgroup.

== See also ==
- c-chart
