= Dorian Shainin =

American engineer, author, and professor (1914–2000)

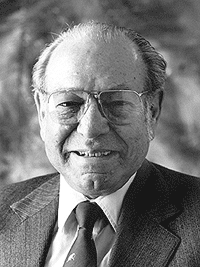
- Born: September 26, 1914; San Francisco, California
- Died: January 7, 2000 (aged 85); Manchester, Connecticut
- Education: Massachusetts Institute of Technology
- Known for: Red X
- Awards: The American Society for Quality's Brumbaugh Award (1951), the Edwards Medal (1969), the Eugene L. Grant Award (1981), and the Shewhart Medal (1989)
- Scientific career
- Fields: Reliability engineering, Acceptance sampling
- Workplaces: United Aircraft Corporation, Grumman Aerospace, Shainin LLC

Dorian Shainin (September 26, 1914 – January 7, 2000) was an American quality consultant, aeronautics engineer, author, and college professor most notable for his contributions in the fields of industrial problem solving, product reliability, and quality engineering, particularly the creation and development of the "Red X" concept.

Shainin (pronounced SHAY-nin), founder of the technical-problem-solving company Shainin LLC, is responsible for the development of over 20 statistical engineering techniques that have become the core of the "Shainin System" for quality and reliability improvement.

Throughout his life, Dorian Shainin worked to improve the quality and reliability of an array of products, including paper, printing, textiles, rubber, nuclear energy, airplanes, automobiles, cassette decks, space ships, light bulbs and disposable diapers, with clients representing over 200 different industries, ranging from the U.S. Department of Defense, Rolls-Royce Ltd. and Exxon to Polaroid, Hewlett-Packard, AT&T and Ford Motor. In total, Shainin advised over 800 companies, 43 of which were among the Fortune 100.

== Early life ==
Dorian Shainin was born in San Francisco on September 26, 1914. He grew up in San Francisco, Shanghai, and New York. He attended Erasmus Hall High School in Brooklyn, New York.

== Early career ==
After receiving his degree in aeronautical engineering from Massachusetts Institute of Technology (MIT) in 1936, Shainin became a design engineer at the Hamilton Standard Division of United Aircraft Corporation (now United Technologies Corporation).

In 1939 US industry had begun to focus on the war effort, and Shainin became a licensee coordinator responsible for helping new Hamilton Standard licensees solve problems. By the end of the war, Shainin was in charge of quality and reliability at Hamilton Standard, having gained national recognition for his invention of the Hamilton Standard Lot Plot.

== Lot Plot ==
Lot Plot refers to a statistical method for acceptance sampling developed by Dorian Shainin in the 1940s. This statistical technique uses the graphical analysis of variable sample data in order to determine if a lot consisting of potentially faulty parts should be accepted or set aside for 100% inspection.

Walter A. Shewhart's development of control charts demonstrated the application of statistical techniques to manufacturing and illustrated the effectiveness of graphical presentation and analysis. Shainin incorporated these concepts in his development of Lot Plot.

In 1946 Shainin was able to demonstrate to the Navy Bureau of Aeronautics that Lot Plot was more effective than 100% inspection. Following this, the Navy agreed to make Lot Plot a standard. Soon Lot Plot was adopted as a standard across many industries.

Taking the advice of his friend and mentor Joseph M. Juran, Shainin turned to the world of consulting. In 1952 Shainin joined Rath & Strong, Inc., a management consulting firm based in Lexington, Massachusetts, holding the position of Senior Vice President.

== Red X and Pareto ==
Shainin's development of the "Red X" concept originated from his association with Joseph Juran. In the 1940s, Juran coined and popularized the notion of "the vital few and trivial many," also known as "The Pareto Principle," recognizing the uneven impact of problems on business performance to be the same phenomenon that Vilfredo Pareto had observed in respect to the distribution of wealth. As suggested by Juran, "I observed (as had many others before me) that quality defects are unequal in frequency, i.e., when a long list of defects was arranged in the order of frequency, a relative few of the defects accounted for the bulk of the defectiveness."

In 1947, Dorian Shainin recognized that the Pareto principle could be applied effectively to the solving of variation problems. Shainin concluded that, amongst the thousands of variables that could cause a change in the value of an output, one cause-effect relationship had to be stronger than the others. Shainin called this primary cause the "Big Red X" and demonstrated that the cause can exist as an interaction among independent variables. The effect of the Red X is then magnified by the square-root-of-the-sum-of-the-squares law, thereby isolating the root cause.

Shainin asserted that his application of statistical methods was more cost-effective and simpler than Taguchi methods. In order to determine the "Red X," Shainin would swap pairs of parts between functional and faulty equipment until the one part responsible for the failure is discovered. Shainin would claim that he could often find the primary defective part within a dozen paired swaps.

Shainin's policy of "talking to the parts" was the primary distinguishing factor that set his methods apart from Taguchi's. In classical or Taguchi DOE (Design of Experiments), engineers would brainstorm to form hypotheses regarding possible causes of a problem. Shainin's methods postpone this theoretical step, requiring first the diagnosis of causes via one or more of four clue generation techniques designed to determine, through the empirical testing of the actual parts in question, the root cause, or "Red X".

In the 1940s Leonard Seder, an MIT classmate and friend, developed the Multi-vari chart, a graphical method for analysis of variance. Shainin was an early adopter of this method, discovering that with Multi-vari charts, he could quickly converge on the root cause of a problem. Multi-vari charts also played an influential role in Shainin's development of the Red X concept.

== Influences ==
Among the statisticians and mathematicians who influenced Shainin's thinking were Ronald Fisher, John Tukey, and Waloddi Weibull.

Shainin's convergence techniques have the capability of reducing the number of Red X possibilities to a few options. Ronald Fisher's statistically designed experiments would then isolate the Red X, revealing potential interactions while confirming the identity of the Red X with statistical confidence.

John Tukey, a proponent of simple statistical techniques, was another influence of Shainin's. As a result of Tukey's work, Shainin developed a simple confirmation test known as a "Six Pack Test." Six Pack Tests were known for being much simpler than t-tests, being non-parametric and having a basic rule set. Shainin further developed this work into an analysis of variance, or ANOVA, permitting non-parametric analysis of Fisher's full factorial experiments.

Like Seder's Multi-Vari charts, Waloddi Weibull's now famous continuous probability distribution fascinated Shainin. Weibull's distribution, along with Shainin's experiences at Hamilton Standard, planted the seed that would eventually become Shainin's system for product reliability. This system was used in the development of Grumman's Lunar Module as well as General Motors' initial production of their anti-lock (ABS) brake system.

== NASA/Apollo 13 ==
During the 1960s Shainin worked for Grumman Aerospace as a reliability consultant for NASA's Apollo Lunar Module. In order to ensure a statistical margin of safety, Shainin developed a completely new approach to reliability assessment, which was applied to the empirical testing of Grumman's Lunar Module prototype components and systems. Shainin's approach to reliability testing was crucial to Grumman's bid in the development of the Lunar Module. The effectiveness of his approach was demonstrated by zero failures in eleven crewed missions, six of which featured Moon landings. When the command module became uninhabitable during the failed Apollo 13 mission, the Lunar Module became the lifeboat that brought the Apollo 13 astronauts to lunar orbit and back to Earth.

During the years that Shainin served as a reliability consultant for Pratt & Whitney Aircraft, he worked on the hydrogen-oxygen fuel cell that powered Apollo environmental life support in addition to the RL10 cryogenic liquid rocket engine. The RL10 soon became America's most reliable space engine, at one point logging 128 ignitions in space without a single failure.

== Further contributions ==
For 38 years Shainin served as statistical consultant on the medical staff at the Newington Children's Hospital in Connecticut. Here, Shainin was able to adapt his techniques to the problems surrounding the etiology of infirmities, specifically amongst disabled children.

From 1950 to 1983 Shainin was on the faculty of the University of Connecticut, where he originated and conducted the continuing education program for people in industry.

In 1987 Shainin further refined his problem prevention approach through his assistance with the introduction of the Detroit Diesel Series 60 engine. Shainin's "Overstress Probe Testing" techniques exposed design weaknesses early in the development process of the engine, which enabled improvements to be made before the final design.

Bob Galvin was assisted by Shainin in his effort to improve quality at Motorola during the 1980s. As a result of Galvin's work, Motorola received the first Malcolm Baldrige National Quality Award in 1989.

Having served for many years on the editorial and technical advisory board of Quality, the Hitchcock journal published by the American Broadcasting Company, Shainin was also appointed to the editorial board of Quality Engineering, the journal for the American Society for Quality (ASQ).

Shainin is the author or co-author of eight books, including "Managing Manpower in the Industrial Environment"(Wm. C. Brown Co.), "Tool Engineers Handbook" (McGraw-Hill), "Industrial Engineering Handbook" (McGraw-Hill), "Quality Control Handbook" (McGraw-Hill), "New Decision-Making Tools for Managers" (Harvard University Press), "Manufacturing, Planning, and Estimating Handbook" (McGraw-Hill), and "Statistics In Action."

== Awards and honors ==
In 1952 Shainin, a Fellow of the American Society for Quality, received the ASQ Brumbaugh Award–honoring the best contribution to industry for that year–in response to his paper, "The Lot Plot Plan." Shainin also received the ASQ Edwards Medal for "best contribution to the management of quality control" for the year 1970. In 1982 he received the ASQ Eugene L. Grant Award for his educational programs. Shainin also received the ASQ's Shewart Medal, becoming the first person to win all four of these prestigious ASQ medals. The Institute of Management Consultants designated Shainin as a Certified Management Consultant, and the American Arbitration Association appointed him to the Panel of Arbitrators. Shainin was additionally elected "Academician" by the International Academy for Quality, and in 1996 ASQ made Shainin its 15th honorary member. Shainin was finally honored by the ASQ with the creation of the Dorian Shainin Medal in 2004.

== Quotes ==
"My particular technique is to say to people, 'Let's stop guessing. Instead, let's find clues–sources of knowledge that you just would not have otherwise.'"
–Dorian Shainin

"Talk to the parts; they are smarter than the engineers." –Dorian Shainin

Shainin Tool Development Highlights
1946	Lot Plot (Shainin)
1948	Reliability Service Monitoring (Shainin)
1952	Precontrol (Shainin/Purcell/Carter/Satterthwaite)
1956	Component Search (Shainin)
Circa 1958	Operation Search (Shainin)
Circa 1960	Tolerance Parallelogram (Shainin)
1964	Overstress Testing (Shainin)
1968	B vs C (Shainin)
1971	Paired Comparisons (Shainin)
1972	Isoplot (Shainin/Pollard)
1973	Variable Search (Shainin)
1976	Randomized Sequencing (Shainin)
circa 1976	Resistant Limit Transform (Shainin)
1977	Rank Order ANOVA (Shainin)
1988	Shainin System for Quality Improvement (Shainin)

== Bibliography ==
=== Print ===
- Acheson, J. Duncan, Quality Control and Industrial Statistics, 5th ed., Homewood, Ill., Richard D. Irwin, Inc., 1986.
- American men & women of science: physical and biological sciences, Bowker, 1986, p. 643, ISBN 0-8352-2228-4
- American Society of Tool Manufacturing Engineers/Shainin, Dorian (contributor), Tool Engineers Handbook, McGraw-Hill, 1949.
- American Statistical Association (ASA), Journal of the American Statistical Association, American Statistical Association, 1954, p. 341
- Bhote, Keki, The Power of Ultimate Six SIGMA, Amacom, New York, 2003, p. 15, ISBN 0-8144-0759-5
- Bhote, Keki, The Ultimate Six Sigma: Beyond Quality Excellence to Total Business, Amacom, New York, 2001, p. 176, ISBN 0-8144-0677-7
- Bhote, Keki, World Class Quality: Using Design of Experiments to Make It Happen, 2nd edition, 2000, Amacom, New York, pp. 79–82, 94-99 ISBN 0-8144-0427-8
- Bursk, John F. and Chapman, Edward C., New Decision-Making Tools for Managers; Mathematical Programming as an Aid in the Solving of Business Problems, Harvard University Press, 1968.
- Carter, A.D.S., Mechanical Reliability, Wiley, 1986, pp. 156–157, ISBN 0-470-20694-2
- Cowden, Dudley Johnstone, Statistical Methods in Quality Control, Prentice-Hall, 1957, pp. 621–624
- Debing, Lawrence M., Quality Control for Plastics Engineers, Reinhold Publishing Co., 1957.
- Grant, Eugene Lodewick, Leavenworth, Richard S., Statistical Quality Control, McGraw-Hill Book Company, New York, 1988, pp. 444, 574–575, ISBN 0-07-024117-1
- Ingle, Sud, In Search of Perfection: How to Create/maintain/improve Quality, Prentice-Hall, 1985, p. 47, ISBN 0-13-467556-8
- Institute of Electrical and Electronics Engineers, IEEE transactions on industry and general applications, IEEE, 1965, p. 87
- IPC Business Press, Quality Today: Measurement & Inspection Technology, IPC Industrial Press, 1994, p. 25
- Juran, J.M., Editor, Quality Control Handbook, First Edition, McGraw-Hill Book Company, New York, 1951, pp. 37–41.
- Rath & Strong, Rath & Strong's Six Sigma Leadership Handbook, Wiley, 1st edition, 2003, p. 2., ISBN 0-471-25124-0
- Rath & Strong, Rath & Strong's Six Sigma Pocket Guide: New Revised Edition, Rath & Strong, Incorporated, Aon Consulting, 2006, p. 10, ISBN 0-9746328-7-2
- Shainin, Dorian, Reliability: Managing a reliability program. "Apollo lunar module engine exhaust products." Science 166, 1969, pp. 733–38.
- Shainin, Dorian (contributing editor), Manufacturing, Planning, and Estimating Handbook, McGraw-Hill Book Company, New York, 1963, ISBN 0-07-001536-8
- Shainin, Dorian, Shainin, Pete, "Better Than Taguchi Orthogonal Tables," Quality and Reliability Engineering International, 1988, p. 4.
- Shainin, Dorian, Shainin, Pete, "Pre-control Versus X & R Charting: Continuous or Immediate Quality Improvement?," Quality Engineering, 1989, p. 419-429.
- Shainin, Dorian, Shainin, Pete, "Statistical Process Control," in Quality Control Handbook, ed. J.M. Juran and F.M. Gryna, McGraw-Hill,1988, section 24.
- Sleeper, Andrew D., Design for Six Sigma Statistics, McGraw-Hill Book Company, New York, 2005, p. 79, ISBN 0-07-145162-5
- Stamatis, D. H., TQM Engineering Handbook, CRC Press, 1997, pp. 240–241 ISBN 0-8247-0083-X
- Stephens, Kenneth S., Juran, Quality, and a Century of Improvement, American Society for Quality, 2004, p. 188, ISBN 0-87389-635-1
- Toedt, Theodore A. and Shainin, Dorian (contributing editor), Managing Manpower in the Industrial Environment, W.C. Brown Co., 1962.
- Traver, Robert W., Manufacturing Solutions For Consistent Quality and Reliability, 1995, Amacom, New York, p. 7, ISBN 0-8144-0271-2.

=== Web ===
- ASQ, December 18, 2007,"Dorian Shainin: A professional approach to problem solving"
- Automotive Design & Production, January 1, 2006, "Detective Work"
- Elsmar Cove Quality Assurance and Business Standards, "Dorian Shainin"
- Juran, J.M., "The Non-Pareto Principle; Mea Culpa"
- Moran, Tim, Automotive News, August 4, 2003, "MANUFACTURING: The man who talked to the parts "
- Rath & Strong Management Consultants, from In This Issue, 1957 Harvard Business Review, "Dorian Shainin"
- Regulatory Compliance Services, "Dorian Shainin"
- Vinas, Tonya, Industry Week, December 21, 2004 "Best Practices -- The Hunt For Red X"

=== Periodicals ===
- ASQ, Spring, 2000, "Shainin Stamp of Quality", p. 9.
- Main, Jeremy, Langan, Patricia A., August 18, 1986, "Under the Spell of the Quality Gurus" Fortune Magazine, pp. 22–23.
- Logothetis, N., 1990, "A Perspective on Shainin's Approach to Experimental Design for Quality Improvement", Quality and Reliability Engineering International, p. 6, 195–202.
- Priddle, Alisa, 2003, "Dean of Lean Chrysler's LaSorda starts to leave his mark", WARD'S AutoWorld, May 2003, pp. 32–34.
- Quality, September, 1982, "A talk with Dorian", pp. 15–18.
- Schultz, William, 1992, "Statistical Engineering", Quality, August, 1992, p. 18.

=== Other Sources ===
- Shainin, Dorian, Shainin, Pete, "Analysis of Experiments," 45th Annual Quality Congress Proceedings, ASQC, 1990, p. 1071-1077.
