= Multi-vari chart =

In quality control, multi-vari charts are a visual way of presenting variability through a series of charts. The content and format of the charts has evolved over time.

== Original concept ==
Multi-vari charts were first described by Leonard Seder in 1950, though they were developed independently by multiple sources. They were inspired by the stock market candlestick charts or open-high-low-close charts.

As originally conceived, the multi-vari chart resembles a Shewhart individuals control chart with the following differences:

- The quality characteristic of interest is measured at two extremes (around its diameter, along its length, or across its surface) and these measurements are plotted as vertical lines connecting the minimum and maximum values over time.
- The quality characteristic of interest is plotted across three horizontal panels that represent:

- Variability on a single piece
- Piece-to-piece variability
- Time-to-time variability

- The quality characteristic of interest is plotted against upper and lower specifications rather than control limits.

=== Interpretation ===
The three panels are interpreted as follows:

| Panel | Condition | Corrective action |
|---|---|---|
| Variability on a single piece | Lengths of the vertical lines (i.e., the range) exceed one-half the specifications (or more) | Repair or realignment of tool |
| Piece-to-piece variability | Excessive scatter | Examine process inputs for excessive variability—lengths of the vertical lines are estimates of process capability |
| Time-to-time variability | Appearance of a non-stationary process | Examine process inputs or steps for evidence of shifts or drifts |

== Recent usage ==
More recently, the term "multi-vari chart" has been used to describe a visual way to display analysis of variance data (typically be expressed in tabular format). It consists of a series of panels which portray minimum, mean, and maximum responses for each treatment combination of interest rather than for periods of time.

Because it is a two-dimensional representation of multiple dimensions (one for each factor in the ANOVA), the multi-vari chart is only useful for comparing the variability among at most four factors.

The chart consists of the following:

- One horizontal panel for each level of the outermost factor
- One cluster of points representing the minimum, mean, and maximum responses for the particular treatment combination, connected by lines for each level of the innermost factor
- In the case of four factors, vertical panels for each level of the next-innermost factor
- As with control charts, the vertical axis depicts the quality characteristic of interest (or experimental response)
