= EpiData =

- Developer: JM Lauritsen (coordinator)
- Stable release: version 4.7 / 2024
- Operating system: Windows (cross-platform version under construction)
- Type: Statistical analysis
- License: Freeware
- Website: www.EpiData.dk

EpiData is a group of applications used in combination for creating documented data structures and analysis of quantitative data.

== Overview ==
The EpiData Association, which created the software, was created in 1999 and is based in Denmark. EpiData was developed in Pascal and uses open standards such as HTML where possible. In many ways, it is the European equivalent of the American Epi Info.

EpiData is widely used by organizations and individuals to create and analyze large amounts of data. The World Health Organization (WHO) uses EpiData in its STEPS method of collecting epidemiological, medical, and public health data, for biostatistics, and for other quantitative-based projects.

Epicentre, the research wing of Médecins Sans Frontières, uses EpiData to manage data from its international research studies and field epidemiology studies. E.g.: Piola P, Fogg C et al.: Supervised versus unsupervised intake of six-dose artemether-lumefantrine for treatment of acute, uncomplicated Plasmodium falciparum malaria in Mbarara, Uganda: a randomised trial. Lancet. 2005 Apr 23–29;365(9469):1467-73 'PMID 15850630'. Other examples: 'PMID 16765397', 'PMID 15569777' or 'PMID 17160135'.

EpiData has two parts:

- Epidata Entry – used for simple or programmed data entry and data documentation. It handles simple forms or related systems
- EpiData Analysis – performs basic statistical analysis, graphs, and comprehensive data management, such as recoding data, label values and variables, and basic statistics. This application can create control charts, such as pareto charts or p-charts, and many other methods to visualize and describe statistical data.

The software is free and Open Source; development is funded by governmental and non-governmental organizations like WHO.

== See also ==
- Clinical surveillance
- Disease surveillance
- Epidemiological methods
- Control chart
