= Common cause and special cause (statistics) =

Statistics concept

Type of variation	Synonyms
Common cause	Chance cause Non-assignable cause Noise; Natural pattern Random effects Random error
Special cause	Assignable cause Signal; Unnatural pattern Systematic effects Systematic error

Common and special causes are the two distinct origins of variation in a process, as defined in the statistical thinking and methods of Walter A. Shewhart and W. Edwards Deming. Briefly, "common causes", also called natural patterns, are the usual, historical, quantifiable variation in a system, while "special causes" are unusual, not previously observed, non-quantifiable variation.

The distinction is fundamental in philosophy of statistics and philosophy of probability, with different treatment of these issues being a classic issue of probability interpretations, being recognised and discussed as early as 1703 by Gottfried Leibniz; various alternative names have been used over the years. The distinction has been particularly important in the thinking of economists Frank Knight, John Maynard Keynes and G. L. S. Shackle.

== Origins and concepts ==
In 1703, Jacob Bernoulli wrote to Gottfried Leibniz to discuss their shared interest in applying mathematics and probability to games of chance. Bernoulli speculated whether it would be possible to gather mortality data from gravestones and thereby calculate, by their existing practice, the probability of a man currently aged 20 years outliving a man aged 60 years. Leibniz replied that he doubted this was possible:

Nature has established patterns originating in the return of events but only for the most part. New illnesses flood the human race, so that no matter how many experiments you have done on corpses, you have not thereby imposed a limit on the nature of events so that in the future they could not vary.

This captures the central idea that some variation is predictable, at least approximately in frequency. This common-cause variation is evident from the experience base. However, new, unanticipated, emergent or previously neglected phenomena (e.g. "new diseases") result in variation outside the historical experience base. Shewhart and Deming argued that such special-cause variation is fundamentally unpredictable in frequency of occurrence or in severity.

John Maynard Keynes emphasised the importance of special-cause variation when he wrote:

By "uncertain" knowledge ... I do not mean merely to distinguish what is known for certain from what is only probable. The game of roulette is not subject, in this sense, to uncertainty ... The sense in which I am using the term is that in which the prospect of a European war is uncertain, or the price of copper and the rate of interest twenty years hence, or the obsolescence of a new invention ... About these matters there is no scientific basis on which to form any calculable probability whatever. We simply do not know!

== Definitions ==
=== Common-cause variations ===
Common-cause variation is characterised by:

- Phenomena constantly active within the system;
- Variation predictable probabilistically;
- Irregular variation within a historical experience base; and
- Lack of significance in individual high or low values.

The outcomes of a perfectly balanced roulette wheel are a good example of common-cause variation. Common-cause variation is the noise within the system.

Walter A. Shewhart originally used the term chance cause. The term common cause was coined by Harry Alpert in 1947. The Western Electric Company used the term natural pattern. Shewhart called a process that features only common-cause variation as being in statistical control. This term is deprecated by some modern statisticians who prefer the phrase stable and predictable.

=== Special-cause variation ===
Special-cause variation is characterised by:

- New, unanticipated, emergent or previously neglected phenomena within the system;
- Variation inherently unpredictable, even probabilistically;
- Variation outside the historical experience base; and
- Evidence of some inherent change in the system or our knowledge of it.

Special-cause variation always arrives as a surprise. It is the signal within a system.

Walter A. Shewhart originally used the term assignable cause. The term special-cause was coined by W. Edwards Deming. The Western Electric Company used the term unnatural pattern.

== Examples ==
=== Common causes ===
- Inappropriate procedures
- Poor design
- Poor maintenance of machines
- Lack of clearly defined standard operating procedures
- Poor working conditions, e.g. lighting, noise, dirt, temperature, ventilation
- Substandard raw materials
- Measurement error
- Quality control error
- Vibration in industrial processes
- Ambient temperature and humidity
- Normal wear and tear
- Variability in settings
- Computer response time

=== Special causes ===
- Faulty adjustment of equipment
- Operator falls asleep
- Defective controllers
- Machine malfunction
- Fall of ground
- Computer crash
- Deficient batch of raw material
- Power surges
- High healthcare demand from elderly people
- Broken part
- Insufficient awareness
- Abnormal traffic (click fraud) on web ads
- Extremely long lab testing turnover time due to switching to a new computer system
- Operator absent

== Importance to industrial and quality management ==
A special-cause failure is a failure that can be corrected by changing a component or process, whereas a common-cause failure is equivalent to noise in the system and specific actions cannot be made to prevent the failure.

Harry Alpert observed:

A riot occurs in a certain prison. Officials and sociologists turn out a detailed report about the prison, with a full explanation of why and how it happened here, ignoring the fact that the causes were common to a majority of prisons, and that the riot could have happened anywhere.

Alpert recognises that there is a temptation to react to an extreme outcome and to see it as significant, even where its causes are common to many situations and the distinctive circumstances surrounding its occurrence, the results of mere chance. Such behaviour has many implications within management, often leading to ad hoc interventions that merely increase the level of variation and frequency of undesirable outcomes.

Deming and Shewhart both advocated the control chart as a means of managing a business process in an economically efficient manner.

== Importance to statistics ==
=== Deming and Shewhart ===
Within the frequency probability framework, there is no process whereby a probability can be attached to the future occurrence of special cause. One might ask whether the Bayesian approach does allow such a probability to be specified. The existence of special-cause variation led Keynes and Deming to an interest in Bayesian probability, but no formal synthesis emerged from their work. Most statisticians of the Shewhart-Deming school take the view that special causes are not embedded in either experience or in current thinking (that is why they come as a surprise; their prior probability has been neglected—in effect, assigned the value zero) so that any subjective probability is doomed to be hopelessly badly calibrated in practice.

It is immediately apparent from the Leibniz quote above that there are implications for sampling. Deming observed that in any forecasting activity, the population is that of future events while the sampling frame is, inevitably, some subset of historical events. Deming held that the disjoint nature of population and sampling frame was inherently problematic once the existence of special-cause variation was admitted, rejecting the general use of probability and conventional statistics in such situations. He articulated the difficulty as the distinction between analytic and enumerative statistical studies.

Shewhart argued that, as processes subject to special-cause variation were inherently unpredictable, the usual techniques of probability could not be used to separate special-cause from common-cause variation. He developed the control chart as a statistical heuristic to distinguish the two types of variation. Both Deming and Shewhart advocated the control chart as a means of assessing a process's state of statistical control and as a foundation for forecasting.

=== Keynes ===
Keynes identified three domains of probability:

- frequency probability;
- subjective or Bayesian probability; and
- events lying outside the possibility of any description in terms of probability (special causes)

and sought to base a probability theory thereon.

== Common mode failure in engineering ==
Common mode failure has a more specific meaning in engineering. It refers to events which are not statistically independent. Failures in multiple parts of a system may be caused by a single fault, particularly random failures due to environmental conditions or aging. An example is when all of the pumps for a fire sprinkler system are located in one room. If the room becomes too hot for the pumps to operate, they will all fail at essentially the same time, from one cause (the heat in the room). Another example is an electronic system wherein a fault in a power supply injects noise onto a supply line, causing failures in multiple subsystems.

This is particularly important in safety-critical systems using multiple redundant channels. If the probability of failure in one subsystem is p, then it would be expected that an N channel system would have a probability of failure of p^{N.} However, in practice, the probability of failure is much higher because they are not statistically independent; for example ionizing radiation or electromagnetic interference (EMI) may affect all the channels.

The principle of redundancy states that, when events of failure of a component are statistically independent, the probabilities of their joint occurrence multiply. Thus, for instance, if the probability of failure of a component of a system is one in one thousand per year, the probability of the joint failure of two of them is one in one million per year, provided that the two events are statistically independent. This principle favors the strategy of the redundancy of components. One place this strategy is implemented is in RAID 1, where two hard disks store a computer's data redundantly.

But even so, a system can have many common modes of failure. For example, consider the common modes of failure of a RAID1 where two disks are purchased from an online store and installed in a computer:

- The disks are likely to be from the same manufacturer and of the same model, therefore they share the same design flaws.
- The disks are likely to have similar serial numbers, thus they may share any manufacturing flaws affecting production of the same batch.
- The disks are likely to have been shipped at the same time, thus they are likely to have suffered from the same transportation damage.
- As installed both disks are attached to the same power supply, making them vulnerable to the same power supply issues.
- As installed both disks are in the same case, making them vulnerable to the same overheating events.
- They will be both attached to the same card or motherboard, and driven by the same software, which may have the same bugs.
- Because of the very nature of RAID1, both disks will be subjected to the same workload and very closely similar access patterns, stressing them in the same way.

Also, if the events of failure of two components are maximally statistically dependent, the probability of the joint failure of both is identical to the probability of failure of them individually. In such a case, the advantages of redundancy are negated. Strategies for the avoidance of common mode failures include keeping redundant components physically isolated.

A prime example of redundancy with isolation is a nuclear power plant. The new ABWR has three divisions of Emergency Core Cooling Systems, each with its own generators and pumps and each isolated from the others. The new European Pressurized Reactor has two containment buildings, one inside the other. However, even here it is possible for a common mode failure to occur (for example, in the Fukushima Daiichi Nuclear Power Plant, mains power was severed by the Tōhoku earthquake, then the thirteen backup diesel generators were all simultaneously disabled by the subsequent tsunami that flooded the basements of the turbine halls).

== See also ==
- Corrective and preventive action (CAPA)
- Nuclear safety
- Probabilistic risk assessment
- Statistical process control
- There are unknown unknowns

== Bibliography ==
- Deming, W. E. (1975) On probability as a basis for action, The American Statistician, 29(4), pp. 146–152
- Deming, W. E. (1982) Out of the Crisis: Quality, Productivity and Competitive Position ISBN 0-521-30553-5
- Keynes, J. M. (1936) The General Theory of Employment, Interest and Money ISBN 1-57392-139-4
- Keynes, J. M. (1921)
- Knight, F. H. (1921) Risk, Uncertainty and Profit ISBN 1-58798-126-2
- Shackle, G. L. S. (1972) Epistemics and Economics: A Critique of Economic Doctrines ISBN 1-56000-558-0
- Shewhart, W. A. (1931) Economic Control of Quality of Manufactured Product ISBN 0-87389-076-0
- Shewhart, W. A. (1939) Statistical Method from the Viewpoint of Quality Control ISBN 0-486-65232-7
- Wheeler, D. J. & Chambers, D. S. (1992) Understanding Statistical Process Control ISBN 0-945320-13-2
