= X bar =

X bar, x̄ (or X̄) or X-bar may refer to:

- X-bar theory, a component of linguistic theory
- Arithmetic mean, a commonly used type of average
- An X-bar, a rollover protection structure
- Roman numeral 10,000 in vinculum form

== See also ==
- X-bar chart, a type of control chart
