= CQE =

CQE may refer to:

- Carbon quantitative easing, an unconventional monetary policy that is featured in a global carbon reward
- Certified Quality Engineer, a certification given by the American Society for Quality
