= Exposure latitude =

Tolerance of a light-sensitive material to over or underexposure

Exposure latitude is the extent to which a light-sensitive material can be exposed (overexposed or underexposed) and still achieve an acceptable result. It is relevant to both digital and analogue processes such as photolithography and photography.

== Applications ==
In the case of optical microlithography this value statistically describes the response of a photoresist to radiation and defines the process window where the photolithographic process can vary within (e.g. how well it compensates for spatial non-uniformities of the illumination). In the case of photography, an artistic case, the measurement of exposure latitude is, by definition dependent on both personal aesthetics and artistic intentions, somewhat subjective. However, the relative differences between media are generally agreed upon: reversal film tends to have very little latitude, while colour negative film has considerably more. Digital sensors vary.

It is not to be confused with dynamic range, the range of light intensities a medium can capture simultaneously. A recording medium with greater dynamic range will be able to record more details in the dark and light areas of a picture. Latitude depends on dynamic range. If the same scene can be recorded using less than the full brightness range available to the medium, the exposure can be shifted along the range without losing information in the shadows or highlights. Greater exposure latitude allows one to compensate for errors in exposure while retaining quality.

In radiography, exposure latitude and dynamic range are equivalent. It is the range of exposures that can be recorded as useful densities on a radiographic film for interpretation. In film-screen radiography, exposure latitude ranges from 10:1 to 100:1. In digital chest radiography, exposure latitude can more than 100:1. In computed radiography, the exposure latitude can reach 10,000:1. High X-ray beam energy will increase the exposure latitude. High intrinsic subject contrast, as in chest radiography, requires wide latitude to differentiate various tissues in the mediastinum and lesions in the lungs. Low intrinsic subject contrast, as in mammography, requires narrow latitude to increase contrast between the different breast tissues or any lesion within them.

== See also ==
- Contrast ratio
