= Data thinking =

Product design framework

Data Thinking is a framework that integrates data science with the design process. It combines computational thinking, statistical thinking, and domain-specific knowledge to guide the development of data-driven solutions in product development. The framework is used to explore, design, develop, and validate solutions, with a focus on user experience and data analytics, including data collection and interpretation

The framework aims to apply data literacy and inform decision-making through data-driven insights.

Beyond its description as a development framework, Data Thinking has also been characterized as a mindset that starts from concrete business problems and use cases rather than from available technologies or data sources. In this view, data-driven solutions are developed and evaluated with regard to their practical application and organizational value creation.

== Major components ==
According to "Computational thinking in the era of data science":

- Data thinking involves understanding that solutions require both data-driven and domain-knowledge-driven rules.
- Data thinking evaluates whether data accurately represents real-life scenarios and improves data collection where necessary.
- The framework highlights the importance of preserving domain-specific meaning during data analysis.
- Data thinking incorporates statistical and logical analysis to identify patterns and irregularities.
- Data thinking involves testing solutions in real-life contexts and iteratively improving models based on new data.
- The process requires evaluating problems from multiple abstraction levels and understanding the potential for biases in generalizations.

== Major phases ==
=== Strategic context and risk analysis ===
Analyzing the broader digital strategy and assessing risks and opportunities is a common step before beginning a project. Techniques like coolhunting, trend analysis, and scenario planning can be used to assist with this.

=== Ideation and exploration ===
In this phase, focus areas are identified, and use cases are developed by integrating organizational goals, user needs, and data requirements. Design thinking methods, such as personas and customer journey mapping, are applied.

=== Prototyping ===
A proof of concept is created to test feasibility and refine solutions through iterative evaluation to optimize for effective performance.

=== Implementation and monitoring ===
Solutions are tested and monitored for performance and continual improvement.

== Implementing data thinking ==
The following resources explain more about data thinking and its applications:

- "Data Thinking: Framework for data-based solutions" by StackFuel
- "What is Data Thinking? A modern approach to designing a data strategy" by Mantel Group
- "Data Science Thinking" by SpringerLink

These sources provide detailed insights into the methodology, phases, and benefits of adopting Data Thinking in organizational processes.

== See also ==
- Statistical thinking
- Analytical thinking
- Computational thinking
