= Regression control chart =

Quality control tool

In statistical quality control, the regression control chart allows for monitoring a change in a process where two or more variables are correlated. The change in a dependent variable can be detected and compensatory change in the independent variable can be recommended. Examples from the Post Office Department provide an application of such models.

== Difference ==
Regression control chart differs from a traditional control chart in four main aspects:

- It is designed to control a varying (rather than a constant) average.
- The control limit lines are parallel to the regression line rather than the horizontal line.
- The computations here are much more complex.
- It is appropriate for use in more complex situations.
