= Epi Info =

Statistical software from the CDC

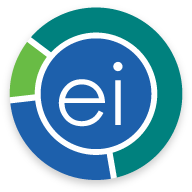

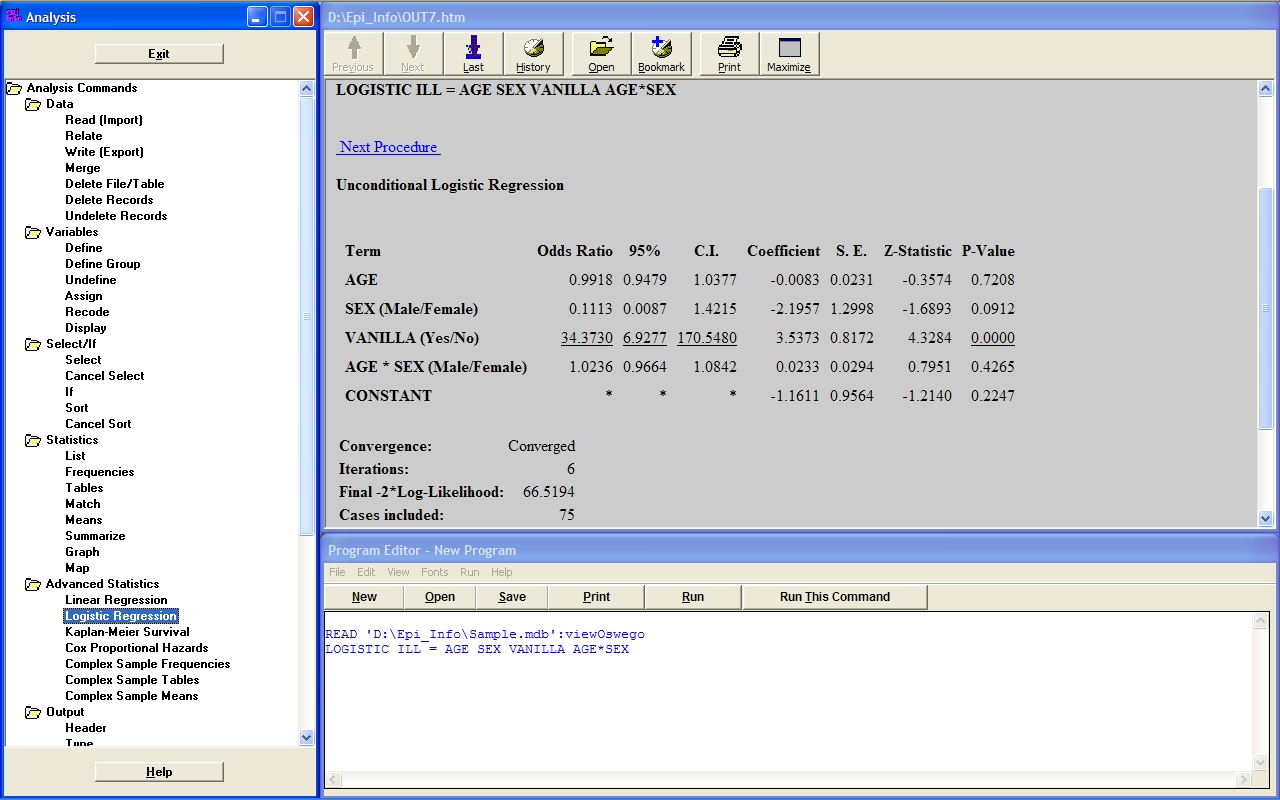
- Screen capture of EpiInfo 3.5.3 Analysis
- Developer: Centers for Disease Control and Prevention
- Final release: 7.2.5 / September 1, 2025; 14 months ago
- Written in: Microsoft Visual C# 4.0
- Operating system: Windows; Android iOS
- Type: Statistical software, epidemiology
- License: Apache License 2.0
- Website: www.cdc.gov/epiinfo/
- Repository: github.com/Epi-Info/Epi-Info-Community-Edition

Epi Info was statistical software for epidemiology developed by Centers for Disease Control and Prevention (CDC) in Atlanta, Georgia (US).

Epi Info was in existence for over 20 years and was available for Microsoft Windows, Android and iOS, along with a web and cloud version. The program allowed for electronic survey creation, data entry, and analysis. Within the analysis module, analytic routines included t-tests, ANOVA, nonparametric statistics, cross tabulations and stratification with estimates of odds ratios, risk ratios, and risk differences, logistic regression (conditional and unconditional), survival analysis (Kaplan Meier and Cox proportional hazard), and analysis of complex survey data. The software was sunset in September 2025. As of August, 2026, CDC has removed virtually all of Epi Info content from its web page. The program is available at Epi Info GitHub https://github.com/Epi-Info.

== History ==
The first version, Epi Info 1, was originally developed by Jeff Dean while he was in high school. It was an MS-DOS batch file on 5.25" floppy disks and released in 1985. MS-DOS continued to be the only supported operating system until the release of Epi Info 2000, which was written in Microsoft's Visual Basic and became the first Windows-compatible version. The last MS-DOS version was Epi Info 6.04d released in January 2001.

The software inspired the creation of the European equivalent, EpiData, in 1999.

Epi Info 2000 changed the way data was stored by adopting the Microsoft Access database format, rather than continuing to use the plain-text file format from the MS-DOS versions. Following the release of Epi Info 2000 was Epi Info 2002, then Epi Info version 3.0, and finally the open-source Epi Info 7. Epi Info 7 was made open source on November 13, 2008, when its source code was uploaded to Codeplex for the first time. The 7 series is the presently maintained Epi Info product line. Note that Epi Info 3 for Windows is different from Epi Info 3 for MS-DOS even though they share the same version number. After Microsoft shut down Codeplex in December 2017, the repository of Epi Info migrated to GitHub.

== Features ==
From a user's perspective, the most important functions of Epi Info are the ability to rapidly develop a questionnaire, customize the data entry process, quickly enter data into that questionnaire, and then analyze the data. For epidemiological uses, such as outbreak investigations, being able to rapidly create an electronic data entry screen and then do immediate analysis on the collected data can save considerable amounts of time versus using paper surveys.

Epi Info uses three distinct modules to accomplish these tasks: Form Designer, Enter, and Analysis. Other modules include the Dashboard module, a mapping module, and various utilities such as StatCalc.

Electronic questionnaires can also be created in the Form Designer module. Individual questions can be placed anywhere on a page and each form may contain multiple pages. The user is given a high degree of control over the form's appearance and function. The user defines both the question's prompt and the format of the data that is to be collected. Data types include numbers, text strings, dates, times, and Boolean. Users can also create drop-down lists, code tables, and comment legal fields. One of the more powerful features of Form Designer is the ability to program intelligence into a form through a feature called "check code". Check code allows for certain events to occur depending on what action a data entry person has taken. For example, if the data entry person types "Male" into a question on gender, any questions relating to pregnancy might then be hidden or disabled. Skip patterns, message boxes, and math operations are also available. Relational database modeling is supported, as users may link their form to any number of other forms in their database.

The "Classic Analysis" module is where users analyze their data. Import and export functions exist that allow for data to be converted between plain-text, CSV, Microsoft Excel, Microsoft Access, MySQL, Microsoft SQL Server, and other formats. Many advanced statistical routines are provided, such as t-tests, ANOVA, nonparametric statistics, cross tabulations and stratification with estimates of odds ratios, risk ratios, and risk differences, logistic regression (conditional and unconditional), survival analysis (Kaplan Meier and Cox proportional hazard), and analysis of complex survey data.

The "Visual Dashboard" module is a lighter-weight Analysis component that is designed to be easy to use, but does not contain the full set of data management features that the "Classic Analysis" module does.

Using the Map module, data can be displayed either by geographic reference or by GPS coordinates.

Older versions of Epi Info contained a Report module and a Menu module. The Report module allowed the user to edit and format the raw output from other Epi Info modules into presentable documents. The menu module allowed for the editing and re-arranging of the basic Epi Info menu structure. This module was powerful enough that several applications have been built off of it (in versions of Epi Info prior to version 7), including the National Electronic Telecommunications System for Surveillance (NETSS) for Epi Info 6. Unlike the other modules, the menu module does not have a design-mode user interface, but instead resides in a .mnu file whose scripts must be edited manually. In Epi Info 7, the Visual Dashboard assumes some of the basic functions of the report module.

Epi Info 7 includes a number of nutritional anthropometric functions that can assist in recording and evaluating measurements of length, stature, weight, head circumference, and arm circumference for children and adolescents. They can be used to calculate percentiles and number of standard deviations from the mean (Z-scores) using the CDC/WHO 1978 growth reference, CDC 2000 growth reference, the WHO Child Growth Reference, or the WHO Reference 2007. It replaces the NutStat and EpiNut modules found in prior versions of Epi Info.

== Epi Info in research ==
Epi Info was used for analysis in medical research, and for data entry. Examples of its use for research include a study of eye conditions, a study of healthcare infections and a study of psychiatric morbidity. Examples of papers that used Epi Info for data entry include a study on nutrition and an epidemiological survey about echinococcosis.

== Reviews of Epi Info ==
Epi Info is very briefly described in a review of software that might be used for research about cancer trend analysis. Another report indicated that Epi Info was among the most widely used tools during outbreaks. Another study also reported that Epi Info was among the tools used to collect data during pandemics. One study compared the statistical results from various free to use statistical software and found that Epi Info gave the same results as did SAS.

== Open Epi ==
OpenEpi is an online version of the software and has inbuilt statistical calculators. For more information, see the article OpenEpi.

== Release history ==
Series	Version	Operating System Support	Support status	Release date	Significant changes
Epi Info for DOS	1	MS-DOS	✗	1 Sep 1985	
Epi Info for DOS	2	MS-DOS	✗	20 Aug 1986	
Epi Info for DOS	3	MS-DOS	✗	1988	
Epi Info for DOS	4.1	MS-DOS	✗	15 Nov 1988	
Epi Info for DOS	5.01	MS-DOS	✗	Oct 1990	Allowed European date formats and non-English characters in data fields.
Epi Info for DOS	6.0	MS-DOS	✗	1992	Added programmable menu system
Epi Info for DOS	6.02	MS-DOS	✗	Oct 1994	
Epi Info for DOS	6.04c	MS-DOS	✗	1998	Year 2000 compatibility upgrade
Epi Info for DOS	6.04d	MS-DOS	✓	Jan 2001	
Epi Info 2000	2000 1.1.2	Windows 9x, NT 4.0, 2000	✗	2 Nov 2001	First Windows-compatible version of Epi Info.
Epi Info 2000	2002 R2	Windows 9x, NT 4.0, 2000, XP	✗	30 Jan 2003	
Epi Info 3	3.0	Windows 9x, NT 4.0, 2000, XP	✗	n/a	
Epi Info 3	3.01	Windows 9x, NT 4.0, 2000, XP	✗	3 Nov 2003	
Epi Info 3	3.2	Windows 9x, NT 4.0, 2000, XP	✗	4 Feb 2004	
Epi Info 3	3.2.2	Windows 9x, NT 4.0, 2000, XP	✗	14 Apr 2004	
Epi Info 3	3.3	Windows 98, NT 4.0, 2000, XP	✗	5 Oct 2004	Windows 95 no longer supported, case-based mapping functionality added to the Analysis MAP command.
Epi Info 3	3.3.2	Windows 98, NT 4.0, 2000, XP	✗	9 Feb 2005	
Epi Info 3	3.4	Windows 98, NT 4.0, 2000, XP	✗	30 Apr 2007	Ability to use standard ISO date formats, disallowed multiple instances of the Analysis module, added ability to run reports from Analysis, and CDC flags added to the Nutrition module.
Epi Info 3	3.4.1	Windows 98, NT 4.0, 2000, XP	✗	9 Jul 2007	Added a right-to-left language controller in Analysis
Epi Info 3	3.4.2	Windows 98, NT 4.0, 2000, XP	✗	20 Sep 2007	
Epi Info 3	3.4.3	Windows 98, NT 4.0, 2000, XP	✗	17 Oct 2007	
Epi Info 3	3.5	Windows 98, NT 4.0, 2000, XP SP3	✗	9 Jun 2008	Added feature to use standardized vocabularies. First version to require Service Pack 3 if running Epi Info on a computer with Windows XP.
Epi Info 3	3.5.1	Windows 98, NT 4.0, 2000, XP SP3, Vista	✓	13 Aug 2008	First version compatible with Windows Vista. This version also fixed compatibility for languages that are read right-to-left.
Epi Info 3	3.5.2	Windows 98, NT 4.0, 2000, XP SP3, Vista, 7	✓	17 Dec 2010	First version compatible with Windows 7. Also included a preview of the new Epi Info 7 MakeView and Enter tools.
Epi Info 3	3.5.3	Windows 98, NT 4.0, 2000, XP SP3, Vista, 7	✓	26 Jan 2011	Minor update to the Epi Info Enter tool released with 3.5.2.
Epi Info 3	3.5.4	Windows 98, NT 4.0, 2000, XP SP3, Vista, 7	✓	10 Aug 2012	Modified installation packaging.
Epi Info 7	7.0.5 (Alpha)	Windows XP, Vista, 7, Ubuntu	✗	5 Jan 2009	Programming language changed to Visual C# .NET; MySQL and SQL Server database support added; XML meta-data support added; Linux compatibility added; first Windows version of Epi Info to be open source.
Epi Info 7	7.0.7.0	Windows XP, Vista, 7	✗	27 Sep 2011	Upgraded framework to .NET version 3.5; Added ability to run Epi Info 7 from a flash drive without administrator rights; Added ability for Epi Info 7 forms to work with essentially unlimited number of fields; Mapping module added; Geocoding added; Visual Dashboard module added; plugin-based data driver model added; Linux and MySQL support removed; Growth charting added.
Epi Info 7	7.0.8.0	Windows XP, Vista, 7	✓	28 Oct 2011	Release build. Added ability to install Epi Info 7 using a traditional setup file; Added new check code commands; Added ability to calculate z-scores for the WHO Child Growth Standards and WHO Reference 2007.
Epi Info 7	7.1.0.6	Windows XP, Vista, 7	✓	9 Aug 2012	Major updates to Dashboard module; Added web-based data entry capability; Added features to allow compatibility with the Epi Info for Android app.
Epi Info 7	7.1.4.0	Windows XP, Vista, 7, 8	✓	11 Jul 2014	Increased precision for some statistical results and other improvements to Analysis. Added ability to decrypt and import data collected on iOS devices and other improvements to Import/Export. Included other minor updates to Form Designer, Enter, and Dashboard.
Epi Info 7	7.1.5.0	Windows XP, Vista, 7, 8	✓	19 Mar 2015	Added SQRT, POISSONLCL, and POISSONUCL functions to Analysis. Fixed regional number formatting issues in Enter. Added small cell size and sparse data warnings to 2x2 and MxN analyses. Included various changes to support the VHF application and to support the Android Companion. Included other minor updates to Form Designer, Enter, Analysis, and Dashboard.
Epi Info 7	7.2.0.1	Requires Microsoft Windows XP or higher with Microsoft .NET 4.0.		27 Jun 2016	
Epi Info 7	7.2.6.0	Requires Microsoft Windows 7 or higher with Microsoft .NET 4.8	✓	25 Oct 2023	
Series	Version	Operating System Support	Support status	Release date	Significant changes

== See also ==
- CSPro
- OpenEpi
- X-12-ARIMA
- Epi Map
