= Shewhart individuals control chart =

For data monitoring in statistical quality control

Individuals and moving range control chart
- Originally proposed by: Walter A. Shewhart

Process observations
- Rational subgroup size: n = 1
- Measurement type: Average quality characteristic per unit
- Quality characteristic type: Variables data
- Underlying distribution: none

Performance
- Size of shift to detect: ≥ 1.5σ

Process variation chart
- Center line: $\overline{MR} = \frac {\sum_{i=2}^m \big| x_i - x_{i - 1} \big| }{m - 1}$
- Upper control limit: $D_4 \overline{MR}$
- Lower control limit: $D_3 \overline{MR}$
- Plotted statistic: $MR_i = \big | x_i - x_{i - 1} \big |$

Process mean chart
- Center line: $\overline{x} = \frac {\sum_{i=1}^m x_{i}}{m}$
- Control limits: $\overline{x} \pm 3\frac {\overline{MR}}{d_2}$
- Plotted statistic: x_{i}

In statistical quality control, the individual/moving-range chart is a type of control chart used to monitor variables data from a business or industrial process for which it is impractical to use rational subgroups.

The chart is necessary in the following situations:

1. Where automation allows inspection of each unit, so rational subgrouping has less benefit.
2. Where production is slow so that waiting for enough samples to make a rational subgroup unacceptably delays monitoring
3. For processes that produce homogeneous batches (e.g., chemical) where repeat measurements vary primarily because of measurement error

The "chart" actually consists of a pair of charts: one, the individuals chart, displays the individual measured values; the other, the moving range chart, displays the difference from one point to the next. As with other control charts, these two charts enable the user to monitor a process for shifts in the process that alter the mean or variance of the measured statistic.

== Interpretation ==
As with other control charts, the individuals and moving range charts consist of points plotted with the control limits, or natural process limits. These limits reflect what the process will deliver without fundamental changes. Points outside of these control limits are signals indicating that the process is not operating as consistently as possible; that some assignable cause has resulted in a change in the process. Similarly, runs of points on one side of the average line should also be interpreted as a signal of some change in the process. When such signals exist, action should be taken to identify and eliminate them. When no such signals are present, no changes to the process control variables (i.e. "tampering") are necessary or desirable.

== Assumptions ==
The normal distribution is NOT assumed nor required in the calculation of control limits. Thus making the IndX/mR chart a very robust tool. This is demonstrated by Wheeler using real-world data^{,} and for a number of highly non-normal probability distributions.

== Calculation and plotting ==
=== Calculation of moving range ===
The difference between data point, $x_i$, and its predecessor, $x_{i-1}$, is calculated as ${MR}_i = \big| x_i - x_{i - 1} \big|$. For $m$ individual values, there are $m-1$ ranges.

Next, the arithmetic mean of these values is calculated as

$\overline{MR}=\frac{\sum_{i=2}^{m}{MR_i}}{m-1}$

If the data are normally distributed with standard deviation $\sigma$ then the expected value of $\overline{MR}$ is $d_{2} \sigma= 2\sigma/\sqrt \pi$, the mean absolute difference of the normal distribution.

=== Calculation of moving range control limit ===
The upper control limit for the range (or upper range limit) is calculated by multiplying the average of the moving range by 3.267:

$UCL_r = 3.267\overline{MR}$.

The value 3.267 is taken from the sample size-specific D_{4} anti-biasing constant for n=2, as given in most textbooks on statistical process control (see, for example, Montgomery).

=== Calculation of individuals control limits ===
First, the average of the individual values is calculated:

$\overline{x}=\frac{\sum_{i=1}^{m}{x_i}}{m}$.

Next, the upper control limit (UCL) and lower control limit (LCL) for the individual values (or upper and lower natural process limits) are calculated by adding or subtracting 2.66 times the average moving range to the process average:

$UCL=\overline{x}+2.66\overline{MR}$.

$LCL=\overline{x}-2.66\overline{MR}$

The value 2.66 is obtained by dividing 3 by the sample size-specific d_{2} anti-biasing constant for n=2, as given in most textbooks on statistical process control (see, for example, Montgomery).

=== Creation of graphs ===
Once the averages and limits are calculated, all of the individuals data are plotted serially, in the order in which they were recorded. To this plot is added a line at the average value, x̅ and lines at the UCL and LCL values.

On a separate graph, the calculated ranges MR_{i} are plotted. A line is added for the average value, M̅R̅ and second line is plotted for the range upper control limit (UCL_{r}).

=== Analysis ===
The resulting plots are analyzed as for other control charts, using the rules that are deemed appropriate for the process and the desired level of control. At the least, any points above either upper control limits or below the lower control limit are marked and considered a signal of changes in the underlying process that are worth further investigation.

== Potential pitfalls ==
The moving ranges involved are serially correlated so runs or cycles can show up on the moving average chart that do not indicate real problems in the underlying process.

In some cases, it may be advisable to use the median of the moving range rather than its average, as when the calculated range data contains a few large values that may inflate the estimate of the population's dispersion.

Some have alleged that departures in normality in the process output significantly reduce the effectiveness of the charts to the point where it may require control limits to be set based on percentiles of the empirically-determined distribution of the process output although this assertion has been consistently refuted. See Footnote 6.

Many software packages will, given the individuals data, perform all of the needed calculations and plot the results. Care should be taken to ensure that the control limits are correctly calculated, per the above and standard texts on SPC. In some cases, the software's default settings may produce incorrect results; in others, user modifications to the settings could result in incorrect results. Sample data and results are presented by Wheeler for the explicit purpose of testing SPC software. Performing such software validation is generally a good idea with any SPC software.

== See also ==
- $\overline{x}$ and R chart
- $\overline{x}$ and s chart
