= Certified Quality Auditor =

A Certified Quality Auditor (CQA) is a professional that knows and employs the standards and principles associated with auditing. A CQA is capable of using various evaluation techniques to identify a production system's strengths and weaknesses in quality control.

A quality audit is a process that involves the systematic identification and examination of a production quality system. A Certified Quality Auditor must analyze all elements of a quality system and assess its degree of adherence to the applicable industry criteria. This is described in detail in Russell.

Formal CQA certification is given by the American Society for Quality (ASQ). Each CQA certification candidate needs to pass a multiple choice examination that focuses mostly on auditing practices, and measures comprehension of the ASQ Body of Knowledge (BOK), covering:

- Auditing Basics
- Process of auditing
- Auditor competencies
- Audit program and business applications
- Quality tools and techniques
