= Process window =

The process window is a graph with a range of parameters for a specific manufacturing process that yields a defined result. Typically multiple parameters are plotted in such a graph with a central region where the process behaves well, while the outer borders define regions where the process becomes unstable or returns an unfavourable result. A statistical evaluation of the process performance is further performed by the calculation of the associated Process Window Index.

== Applications ==
Typical applications are found in photolithography where the response of a photoresist to parameters like temperature, radiation intensity, critical dimension and sidewall angle of the structures, etc. are plotted versus an optical parameter such as the numerical aperture to optimize the design of an exposure tool or to achieve a reproducible result and high yield.
