= Certified Quality Engineer =

Certified Quality Engineer, often abbreviated CQE, is a certification given by the American Society for Quality (ASQ). These engineers are professionally educated in quality engineering and quality control.

They are trained in researching and preventing unnecessary costs through lack of quality, lost production costs, lost market share due to poor quality, etc. They possess the knowledge needed to set up quality control circles, assess potential quality risks, and evaluate human factors and natural process variation.

== Scope ==
CQE training includes the following topics:

- Management Systems
- Project Management
- Quality Information Systems
- Leadership Principles and Techniques
- Training
- Cost of Quality
- Quality Philosophies & Approaches
- History of Quality
- Total Quality Management
- Customer Relations
- Quality Deployment
- Supplier Qualification & Certification Systems
- Quality Systems
- Documentation Systems
- Configuration Management
- Planning, Controlling and Assuring Product and Process Quality
- Design Inputs and Design Review
- Validation and Qualification Methods
- Process Capability
- Interpretation of Technical Drawings and Specifications
- Material Control
- Acceptance Sampling
- Calibration Systems
- Measurement Systems
- Measurement System Analysis
- Gage Repeatability and Reproducibility (Gage R & R)
- Destructive and Nondestructive Testing and Measuring
- Traceability to Standards
- Reliability and Risk Management
- Design of Systems for Reliability
- Failure Mode and Effects Analysis (FMEA)
- Fault Tree Analysis (FTA)
- Management and Planning Tools
- Corrective Action
- Preventive Action
- Overcoming Barriers to Quality Improvement
- Concepts of Probability and Statistics
- Properties and Applications of Probability Distributions
- Tests for Means, Variances, and Proportions
- Statistical Decision Making
- Drawing Valid Statistical Conclusions
- Statistical Process Control
- Control Charts
- Design of Experiments

== Techniques ==
Some techniques that Quality Engineers use in quality engineering/assurance include:

- Statistical Process Control
- Deming's Wheel
- Total Quality Management (TQM)
- Six Sigma

== Applications ==
These techniques are applicable company/system wide and are, by definition, not only developed for manufacturing processes. Application areas include:

- Purchasing
- Sales and After-sales Support
- Manufacturing
- Customer Service
- Human Resource Management
- Research and Development
- Information Technology

== Professional certification ==
The American Society for Quality (ASQ) is a professional institute that examines the professional competency of candidates and, if found to be acceptable, awards them with official certification. This process helps to establish and maintain a minimum body of knowledge and skill level among certified engineers. The exam changes from test-to-test in minor detail and the body of knowledge is revised and updated by peer review committees set up by the ASQ.

There are two formats for the ASQ certification test:

- Computer Delivered - This CQE examination is a one-part, 175- multiple choice question, five-and-a-half-hour exam and is offered in English only. 160 multiple choice questions are scored and 15 are unscored.
- Paper and Pencil - This CQE examination is a one-part, 160- multiple choice question, five-hour exam and is offered in English only.
