= Social information seeking =

Social information seeking is a field of research that involves studying situations, motivations, and methods for people seeking and sharing information in participatory online social sites, such as Yahoo! Answers, Answerbag, WikiAnswers and Twitter as well as building systems for supporting such activities. Highly related topics involve traditional and virtual reference services, information retrieval, information extraction, and knowledge representation.

== Background ==
Social information seeking is often materialized in online question-answering (QA) websites, which are driven by a community. Such QA sites have emerged in the past few years as an enormous market, so to speak, for the fulfillment of information needs. Estimates of the volume of questions answered are difficult to come by, but it is likely that the number of questions answered on social/community QA (cQA) sites far exceeds the number of questions answered by library reference services, which until recently were one of the few institutional sources for such question answering. cQA sites make their content – questions and associated answers submitted on the site – available on the open web, and indexable by search engines, thus enabling web users to find answers provided for previously asked questions in response to new queries.

The popularity of such sites have been increasing dramatically for the past several years. Major sites that provide a general platform for questions of all types include Yahoo! Answers, Answerbag and Quora. While other sites that focus on particular fields; for example, StackOverflow (computing). StackOverflow has 3.45 million questions, 1.3 million users and over 6.86 million answers since July 2008 while Quora has 437 thousand questions, 264 thousand users and 979 thousand answers.

Social Q&A or cQA, according to Shah et al., consists of three components: a mechanism for users to submit questions in natural language, a venue for users to submit answers to questions, and a community built around this exchange. Viewed in that light, online communities have performed a question answering function perhaps since the advent of Usenet and Bulletin Board Systems, so in one sense cQA is nothing new. Websites dedicated to cQA, however, have emerged on the web only within the past few years: the first cQA site was the Korean Naver Knowledge iN, launched in 2002, while the first English-language CQA site was Answerbag, launched in April 2003. Despite this short history, however, cQA has already attracted a great deal of attention from researchers investigating information seeking behaviors, selection of resources, social annotations, user motivations, comparisons with other types of question answering services, and a range of other information-related behaviors.

== Research questions ==
Some of the interesting and important research questions in this area include:

- What causes people to be involved in social Q&A?
- What is the motivation of people who participate in social Q&A?
- Why do questioners choose social Q&A as a source to find information?
- Why do they ask questions online to people whose background or expertise may be unverified?
- Why do they choose social Q&A over other sources to look for information?
- What do they expect from answers given by anonymous people on the Web?
- Why are the answerers willing to share information and knowledge with anonymous people, for free?
- Why do they spend time and effort to find information and help others online? Why are they willing to expose their personal stories to people and inform others with their experiences?

Shah et al. provide a detailed research agenda for social Q&A. A new book by Shah presents a more recent and comprehensive information pertaining to social information seeking.

== Friendsourcing in social Q&A ==
Friendsourcing is an important component of social question and answering, including how to route questions to friends or others who will most likely answer the question. The important questions include what people's behaviors are in social networks, especially what kinds of questions people ask from their social networks and how different question types affect the frequency, speed and quality of answers they receive.

Morris et al. (2010) conducted a survey of question and answering within social networks with 624 people, and gathered detailed data about the behavior of Q&A, including frequency, types of questions and answers, and motivations. They found that half (50.6%) of respondents reported having used their status messages to ask a question, which indicated that Q&A on social networks is popular. Also, the types of questions people asked include recommendation, opinion, factual knowledge, rhetorical, etc. And motivations for asking include trust, asking subjective questions, etc. Their analysis also explored the relationships between answer speed and quality, questions’ property and participants’ property. Only a very small portion (6.5%) of the questions were answered, but the 89.3% of the respondents were satisfied with the response time they experienced even though there's a discrepancy between that and expectation. Also, the responses gathered via social networks appear to be very valuable. Their findings implied design for search tools that could combine the speed and breadth of traditional search engines with the trustworthiness, personalization, and the high engagement of social media Q&A.

Paul et al. (2011) did a study on question and answering on Twitter, and found that out of the 1152 questions they examined, the most popular question types asked on Twitter were rhetorical (42%) and factual (16%). Surprisingly, along with entertainment (29%) and technology (29%) questions, people asked personal and health-related questions (11%). Only 18.7% questions received response, while a handful of questions received a high number of responses. The larger the askers’ network, the more responses she received; however, posting more tweets or posting more frequently did not increase chances of receiving a response. Most often the “follow” relationship between asker and answerer was one-way. Paul et al. also examined what factors of the askers would increase the chance of getting a response and found that more relevant responses are received when there is a mutual relationship between askers and answerers. Intuitively, we would expect this, as mutual relationship would indicate stronger tie strength and hence, more number of relevant answers.

== Social Q&A services ==
Existing social Q&A services can be characterized from the three perspectives, by the definition of social Q&A as a service involving (1) a method for presenting information needs, (2) a place for responding to information need, and (3) participation as a community.

=== Presenting information needs ===
These social networks support various friendsourcing behavior, provide information benefits that oftentimes traditional search tools cannot, and also may reinforce social bonds through the process. However, there are many questions and limitations that may prevent people from asking questions on their social networks. For example, they may feel uncomfortable asking questions that are too private, might not want to cost too much other people's time and effort, or might feel the burden of social debts.

Rzeszotarski and Morris (2014) took a novel approach to explore the perceived social costs of friendsourcing on Twitter via monetary choices. They modeled friendsourcing costs across users, and compared it with crowdsourcing on Amazon Mechanical Turk. Their findings suggested interesting design considerations for minimizing social cost by building a hybrid system combining friendsourcing and crowdsourcing with microtask markets.

=== Responding to information needs ===
Sometimes, only asking question from people's own social networks or friends is not enough. If the question is obscure or time sensitive, no members of their social networks may know the answer. For example, this person's friends might not have expertise in providing evaluations for a specific model of digital camera. Also asking the current wait time for security at the local airport might not be possible if none of this person's friends are currently at the airport.

Nichols and Kang (2012) leveraged Twitter for question and answering with targeted strangers by taking advantage of its public accessibility. In their approach, they mined the public status updates posted on Twitter to find strangers with potentially useful information, and send questions to these strangers to collect responses. As a feasibility study, they collected information regarding response rate, and response time. 42% of users responded to questions from strangers, and 44% of the responses arrived within 30 minutes.

=== Participation as a community ===
Another important and unique component of social Q&A system is that it is a community which allows members to form relationships and bonds, so that their behavior in these social Q&A services will also add to their social capital.

Gray et al. (2013) explored how bridging social capital, question type and relational closeness influence the perceived usefulness and satisfaction of information obtained through questions asked on Facebook. Their results indicated that bridging social capital could positively predict the perceived utility of the acquired information, meaning that information exchanges on social networks is an effective way of social capital conversion. Also, useful answers are more likely to be received from weak ties than strong ties.

== Authority detection in social media ==
In order to recommend the most appropriate users to provide answers in a social network, we need to find approaches to detect users' authority in a social network. In the field of information retrieval, there has been a trend of research investigating ways to detect users' authority effectively and accurately in a social network.

Cha et al. investigate possible metrics for determining authority users on popular social network Twitter. They propose the following three simple network-based metrics and discuss their usefulness in determining a user's influence.

1. indegree (followers count)
2. retweet count
3. mention count

An initial analysis of the three aforementioned metrics showed that the users with the highest indegrees and the users with the highest retweet/mention counts were not the same. The top 1% of users by indegree are shown to have very low correlation with the same percentile of users by retweets and by mentions. This implies that follower count is not useful in determining whether a user's tweets get retweeted or whether the other users engage with them.

Pal et al. designed features to measure a user's authority on a certain topic. For example, retweet impact refers to how many times a certain user has been retweeted on a certain topic. The impact is dampened by a factor measuring how many times the user had been retweeted by a unique author to avoid the cases when a user has fans who retweet regardless of the content. They first used a clustering approach to find the target cluster which has the highest average score across all features, and used a ranking algorithm to find the most authoritative users within the cluster.

With these authority detection methods, social Q&A could be more effective in providing accurate answers to askers.
