= Statistical thinking =

Set of problem-solving methods

Statistical thinking is a tool for process analysis of phenomena in relatively simple terms, while also providing a level of uncertainty surrounding it. It is worth nothing that "statistical thinking" is not the same as "quantitative literacy", although there is overlap in interpreting numbers and data visualizations.

Statistical thinking relates processes and statistics, and is based on the following principles:

- All work occurs in a system of interconnected processes.
- Variation exists in all processes
- Understanding and reducing variation are keys to success.

== History ==
"The great body of physical science ... [is] only accessible and only thinkable to those who have had a sound training in mathematical analysis, and the time may not be very remote when it will be understood that for complete initiation as an efficient citizen ... it is necessary to be able to compute, to think in averages and maxima and minima, as it is now to be able to read and write."

— H.G. Wells, Mankind in the Making

W. Edwards Deming promoted the concepts of statistical thinking, using two powerful experiments:

1. The Red Bead experiment, in which workers are tasked with running a more or less random procedure, yet the lowest "performing" workers are fired. The experiment demonstrates how the natural variability in a process can dwarf the contribution of individual workers' talent.
2. The Funnel experiment, again demonstrating that natural variability in a process can loom larger than it ought to.

The take home message from the experiments is that before management adjusts a process—such as by firing seemingly underperforming employees, or by making physical changes to an apparatus—they should consider all sources of variation in the process that led to the performance outcome.

Nigel Marriott breaks down the evolution of statistical thinking.

== Benchmarks ==
Statistical thinking is thought to help in different contexts, such as the courtroom, biology labs, and children growing up surrounded by data.

The American Statistical Association (ASA) describes the "statistically educated" as understanding the following:

- data beat anecdotes
- data is natural, predictable, and quantifiable
- random sampling allows results of surveys and experiments to be extrapolated to the population
- random assignment in comparative experiments allows cause-and-effect conclusions to be drawn
- to know association is not causation
- significance does not necessarily imply practical importance, especially for studies with large sample sizes
- no statistically significant difference or relationship does not necessarily mean there is no difference or no relationship in the population, especially for studies with small sample sizes

Statistical thinking is a recognized method used as part of Six Sigma methodologies.

== See also ==
- Systems thinking
- Evidence-based practice
- Analytical thinking
- Critical thinking
- Computational thinking
- Data thinking
