= American Society for Quality =

Knowledge-based global community of quality professionals

American Society for Quality (ASQ)
- Abbreviation: ASQ
- Formation: 16 February 1946; 80 years ago
- Founder: George D. Edwards
- Type: Professional association
- Purpose: To provide the quality community with training, professional certifications, and knowledge to a vast network of members of the global quality community.
- Headquarters: Milwaukee, Wisconsin
- Coordinates: 43.03740°N 87.91117°W
- Region served: Worldwide
- Services: Certification, training, publications, conferences
- Members: 30000 (approximately)
- Chair: Daniella Picciotti
- Chair-elect: David Levy
- Treasurer: Lou Ann Lathrop
- Main organ: Board of directors
- Affiliations: Exemplar Global, ASQExcellence
- Website: asq.org
- Formerly called: American Society for Quality Control

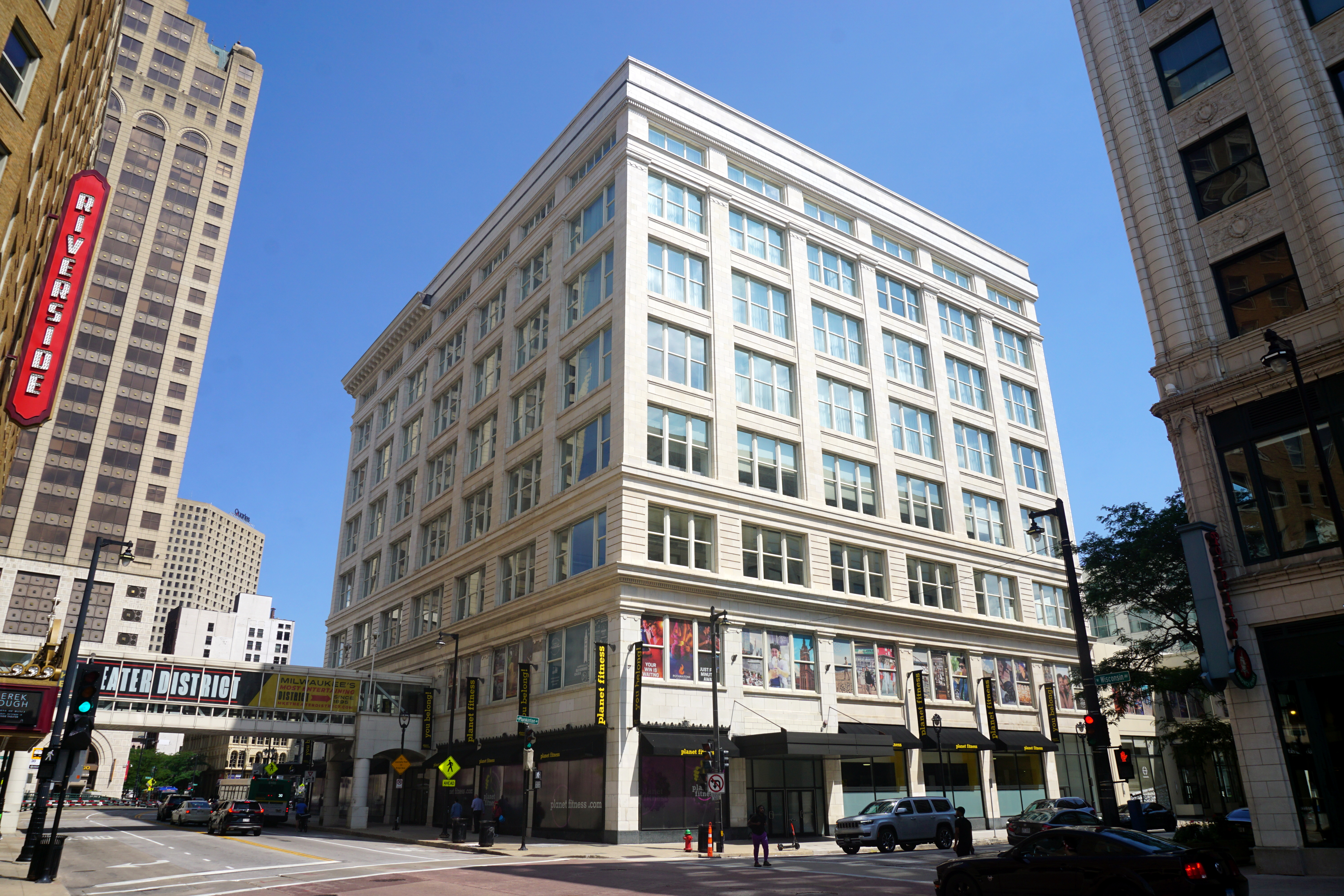
ASQ Center in Milwaukee

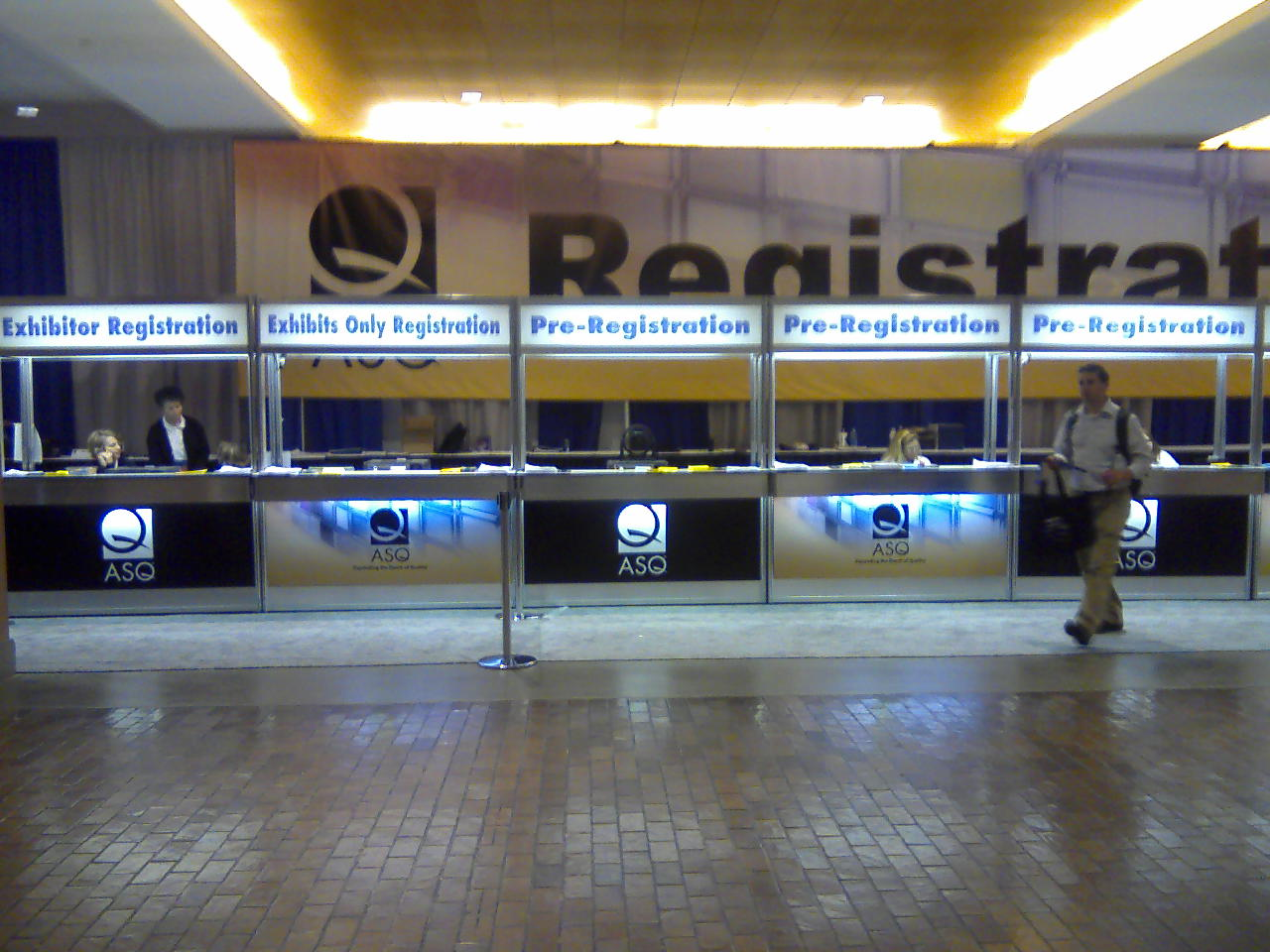
ASQ registration booth at America's Center in St. Louis for the 2010 meeting on 24 May

The American Society for Quality (ASQ), formerly the American Society for Quality Control (ASQC), is a society of quality professionals, with more than 30,000 members, in more than 140 countries.

== History ==
ASQC was established on 16 February 1946 by 253 members in Milwaukee, Wisconsin, with George D. Edwards as its first president. The organization was first created as a way for quality experts and manufacturers to sustain quality-improvement techniques used during World War II.

In 1948, ASQC's Code of Ethics established standards for members to conduct their activities and business. Business writer Armand V. Feigenbaum served as president of the society in 1961–63.

In 1997, the members of the organization voted to change its name from "American Society for Quality Control" to "American Society for Quality".

== Quality ==
ASQ provides its members with certification, training, publications, conferences, and other services. ASQ is a founding partner of the American Customer Satisfaction Index (ACSI), a quarterly economic indicator.

Since 1989, ASQ has administered the annual Malcolm Baldrige National Quality Award. The ASQ also gives the Dorian Shainin Medal, which is awarded annually for the "Development and Application of Creative or Unique Statistical Approaches in the Solving of Problems Relative to the Quality of Product or Service".

== Certifications ==
ASQ offers 18 professional certifications relating to various aspects of the quality profession. Professional certification exams are translated into five languages included English, Korean, Mandarin, Portuguese, and Spanish. Exams are given nationally and, to a limited degree, worldwide several times annually. The body of knowledge for each certification is maintained through peer review every few years on a rotating schedule.

In 1968, the first ASQ certification was offered.

In 2016, ASQ's certification exam delivery method changed from paper to computer-based testing at Prometric nationwide testing facilities.

List of ASQ Certifications
Category	Abbr.	Title	Description
Management	CMQ/OE	Certified Manager of Quality/ Organizational Excellence	
Management	CSQP	Certified Supplier Quality Professional	
Foundational Quality	CQIA	Certified Quality Improvement Associate	
Foundational Quality	CQPA	Certified Quality Process Analyst	
Inspector/Technician	CCT	Certified Calibration Technician	
Inspector/Technician	CQI	Certified Quality Inspector	
Inspector/Technician	CQT	Certified Quality Technician	
Engineering	CQE	Certified Quality Engineer	
Engineering	CRE	Certified Reliability Engineer	
Engineering	CSQE	Certified Software Quality Engineer	
Six Sigma	CSSBB	Certified Six Sigma Black Belt	
Six Sigma	CSSGB	Certified Six Sigma Green Belt	
Six Sigma	CSSYB	Certified Six Sigma Yellow Belt	
Six Sigma	CMBB	Certified Master Black Belt	
Auditing	CFSQA	Certified Food Safety and Quality Auditor	
Auditing	CMDA	Certified Medical Device Auditor	
Auditing	CPGP	Certified Pharmaceutical GMP Professional	
Auditing	CQA	Certified Quality Auditor	

== Publications ==
ASQ publishes a range of magazines and journals:

- Quality Progress
- Journal for Quality and Participation
- Journal of Quality Technology
- Quality Engineering
- Quality Management Journal
- Lean & Six Sigma Review
- Software Quality Professional
- Technometrics
- Journal for Quality Perspectives in Knowledge Acquisition
- Quality Management Forum
- Primers on Human Development and Leadership

== Conferences ==
ASQ hosts a number of quality events and annual conferences worldwide:

== See also ==
- European Foundation for Quality Management (EFQM)
- Total Quality Management (TQM)
- Technometrics
