= Harry Alpert =

American sociologist (1912–1977)

Harry Alpert (1912–1977) was an American sociologist, best known for his directorship of the National Science Foundation's (NSF) social science program in the 1950s. During his time at the NSF (1953–1958), Alpert guided the development of the U.S. NSF's earliest efforts to provide funding to the social sciences, and helped to establish the agency's basic policy framework for funding social science research and fellowships. In his short five-year term as director, Alpert was able to establish a viable policy framework for NSF funding that would help to demonstrate both the value and scientific legitimacy of social science research.

== Early life ==
Born to a Jewish family in New York City, Alpert completed his undergraduate studies at the City College of New York in 1932 before enrolling in Columbia University's graduate program in sociology the following year. Alpert's strong interest in French sociology took him to the French universities of Paris and Bordeaux from the period of 1932–1933. After completing his master's degree in 1935, and his doctoral degree in 1938, Alpert took up a postdoctoral fellowship at the University of Chicago from the period of 1940–1941.

Although Alpert was interested in a range of foundational issues regarding the social sciences, Alpert's doctoral dissertation, as well as a number of his early publications focused on the famous French sociologist Emile Durkheim. In an attempt to promote Durkheim's social theories to American academic audiences, many of Alpert's early studies as well as his highly influential book, Emile Durkheim and His Sociology, aimed to clarify how Durkheim understood the ontology of the social word, social science methodology, relations between the social and natural sciences, and the social relevance of social science.

After Alpert received his Ph.D. in 1938, he worked as an assistant professor of sociology at the City College of New York.

== Participation in the war effort ==
During the 1940s Harry Alpert was one of the many social scientists who became involved in the war effort. Alpert worked in the United States Office of War Information from 1943 to 1944; the Office of Price Administration from 1944 to 1945; in the Bureau of the Budget from 1945 to 1948; and as a consultant on manpower problems for the United States Air Force's Research and Development Board from 1948 to 1950. His participation in these federal positions made statistics and public opinion research central interests for Alpert, and helped to establish him as an important figure in both of these areas.

== NSF policy work ==
After WWII, Alpert continued his overlapping career as a university scholar. He remained at the City College of New York until 1947, served as a research consultant to Columbia University's Bureau of Applied Social Research from 1946 to 1948, as a lecturer and adjunct professor of sociology at American University in 1947, and again from 1950 to 1953. He also worked as an associate professor of sociology at Yale University in the summer of 1947, as an associate professor of sociology and the chairman of the anthropology and sociology department at Queens College from 1948 to 1950, as a researcher in social psychiatry at Cornell University Medical College from 1951 to 1956, and as a professor of sociology at the University of Washington in 1955. In 1958 he was elected as a Fellow of the American Statistical Association. After returning to the federal Budget Bureau for three years until 1953, Alpert began working at the National Science Foundation as the social science programme director.

In this position Alpert began to lobby for increased NSF funding for the social sciences. In order to affirm the scientific import of social science research, Alpert downplayed the differences between certain social and natural sciences in the areas of ontology, methodology, and social relevance, emphasizing the place of the social sciences within a unified scientific enterprise. To do this, Alpert asserted that the "hard science core" of the social sciences (i.e. Those social science studies that adopted quantitative research methods) could fall under the NSF mandate to support basic research which conforms to the highest standards of scientific inquiry and fulfills the basic conditions of objectivity, verifiability, and generality.

== Historiographic legacy ==
Although a variety of scholars have noted that Alpert's efforts to establish a viable policy framework for social science funding during his sort NSF tenure were remarkably consequential (with social scientists Richard J. Hill and Walter T. Martin asserting that, "to a significant degree, NSF support for the social sciences rests upon the philosophy and policies established by Harry Alpert,") historians of science Mark Solovey and Jefferson D. Pooley argue that this success might have come at a price. Although during his NSF directorship Alpert made "unity of science" arguments in his attempt to secure additional funding for the social sciences, Alpert's later writings show that he saw many important differences between the natural and social sciences, especially in terms of their scientific status, research aims, and respective methodologies.

The sort of concerns that Alpert expressed about the hierarchical relations between the social and natural sciences would inform national science policy discussions and debates in the coming decades.

== Selected publications ==
"France's First University Course in Sociology." American Sociological Review, 2 (1937): 311–317.

"Operational Definitions in Sociology." American Sociological Review, 3 (1938): 855–861.

"Explaining the Social Socially." Social Forces, 17 (1938/1939): 361–5.

Emile Durkheim and His Sociology. New York: Columbia University Press, 1939.

"Emile Durkheim and Sociologismic Psychology." American Journal of Sociology, 45 (1939): 64–70.

"National Series on State Judicial Criminal Statistics Discontinued." Journal of Criminal Law and Criminology, 39 (1948): 181–8.

"A Comment." Public Opinion Quarterly, 14 (1950/1951), 685–6.

"The Federal Statistical System." American Journal of Sociology, 56 (1951): 468–75.

"Some Observations on the Sociology of Sampling." Social Forces, 31 (1952/1953): 30–3.

"A Critical Introduction to 'Congressional Use of Polls: A Symposium.'" Public Opinion Quarterly, 18 (1954), 121–3.

"The National Science Foundation and Social Science Research." American Sociological Review, 19 (1954): 208–11.

"The Social Sciences and the National Science Foundation, 1945-1955." American Sociological Review, 20 (1955): 653–61.

"Public Opinion Research as Science." Public Opinion Quarterly, 20 (1956): 493–500.

"The Social Science Research Program of the National Science Foundation." American Sociological Review, 22 (1957):582-5.

"Emile Durkheim: A Perspective and Appreciation." American Sociological Review, 24 (1959): 462–5.

"The Government's Growing Recognition of Social Science." Annals of the American Academy of Political and Social Sciences, 327 (1960): 59–67.

"Some Observations on the State of Sociology." Pacific Sociological Review, 6 (1963):45-8.
