= George D. Edwards =

Quality control expert

George DeForest Edwards (1890 – 1974) was a 20th-century quality control expert most notable for having served as the first president of American Society for Quality Control.

Edwards' reputation in quality control had been established by his work as head of the inspection engineering department of Bell Telephone Laboratories and as Bell’s director of quality assurance, a term he coined. During World War II, he served as a consultant to the US Army Ordnance Department, and later to the War Production Board.

Edwards retired from Bell in 1955 but he remained active in ASQ, serving as chair of the Committee on Constitution and Bylaws, and later as deputy executive secretary for dues abatement.
