= Nonconformity (quality) =

Nonfulfillment of a requirement

In quality management, a nonconformity (sometimes referred to as a non conformance or nonconformance or defect) is a deviation from a specification, a standard, or an expectation. Nonconformities or nonconformance can be classified in seriousness multiple ways, though a typical classification scheme may have three to four levels, including critical, serious, major, and minor.

While some situations allow "nonconformity" and "defect" to be used synonymously, some industries distinguish between the two; a nonconformity represents a failure to meet an intended state and specification, while a defect represents a failure to meet fitness for use/normal usage requirements. This can be seen in the international software engineering standard ISO/IEC 25010 (formerly ISO/IEC 9126), which defines a nonconformity as the nonfulfillment of a requirement and a defect as the nonfulfillment of intended usage requirements.

== Classifying nonconformity ==
When ensuring quality of a product or a service, classification of a nonconformity is important, as it provides an opportunity to better reduce nonconformity. Many quality management practices will do this using a relatively simple three- or four-level classification system. For example, U.S. federal agencies such as the National Aeronautics and Space Administration have used a simple three-tier system for quality requirements of government-acquired supplies and services: minor, major, and critical nonconformance. However, some industries may develop their own, custom ranking systems. An example from the automotive industry uses a 10-point system for finer granularity, where, for example, a one represents "none" (no effect), a six "moderate" (vehicle or item operable, but comfort or convenience items inoperable), and a 10 "hazardous without warning" (when a potential failure mode affects safe vehicle operation without warning). Regardless of size, these classification schemes exist to help drive discovery and correction of nonconformities (and defects).

== Sources of nonconformity ==
The causes of nonconformities are not unlimited and therefore determinable. Common causes for deficiencies to arise include:

- poor communication (or miscommunication)
- poor documentation (or lack of documentation)
- poor or limited training of personnel
- poor motivation of personnel
- poor quality materials (or lack of appropriate materials)
- poor quality tools and equipment (or lack of appropriate tools and equipment)
- poor or dysfunctional operating environment
