= Control chart =

Tool to assess control of a manufacturing process

A control chart

Control charts (also known as Shewhart charts, after Walter A. Shewhart, or process-behavior charts) are graphical plots used in statistical process control (SPC) to determine whether a manufacturing or business process is in a state of statistical control. They form the basis of modern statistical process control, and are one of the seven basic tools of quality control.

A control chart plots a process statistic, such as a mean, range, or proportion, over time together with a centre line and upper and lower control limits that distinguish common-cause variation from special-cause variation. Points outside the control limits or non-random patterns within them indicate that the process should be investigated for assignable causes of variation. When a process is in statistical control, control charts can be used to predict its future performance. Control charts were invented by Shewhart at Bell Labs in the 1920s.

== Overview ==
If analysis of the control chart indicates that the process is currently under control (i.e., is stable, with variation only coming from sources common to the process), then no corrections or changes to process control parameters are needed or desired. In addition, data from the process can be used to predict the future performance of the process. If the chart indicates that the monitored process is not in control, analysis of the chart can help determine the sources of variation, as this will result in degraded process performance. A process that is stable but operating outside desired (specification) limits (e.g., scrap rates may be in statistical control but above desired limits) needs to be improved through a deliberate effort to understand the causes of current performance and fundamentally improve the process.

The control chart is one of the seven basic tools of quality control. Typically control charts are used for time-series data, also known as continuous data or variable data. Although they can also be used for data that has logical comparability (i.e. you want to compare samples that were taken all at the same time, or the performance of different individuals); however the type of chart used to do this requires consideration.

== History ==
The control chart was invented by Walter A. Shewhart working for Bell Labs in the 1920s. The company's engineers had been seeking to improve the reliability of their telephony transmission systems. Because amplifiers and other equipment had to be buried underground, there was a stronger business need to reduce the frequency of failures and repairs. By 1920, the engineers had already realized the importance of reducing variation in a manufacturing process. Moreover, they had realized that continual process-adjustment in reaction to non-conformance actually increased variation and degraded quality. Shewhart framed the problem in terms of common- and special-causes of variation and, on May 16, 1924, wrote an internal memo introducing the control chart as a tool for distinguishing between the two. Shewhart's boss, George Edwards, recalled: "Dr. Shewhart prepared a little memorandum only about a page in length. About a third of that page was given over to a simple diagram which we would all recognize today as a schematic control chart. That diagram, and the short text which preceded and followed it set forth all of the essential principles and considerations which are involved in what we know today as process quality control." Shewhart stressed that bringing a production process into a state of statistical control, where there is only common-cause variation, and keeping it in control, is necessary to predict future output and to manage a process economically.

Shewhart created the basis for the control chart and the concept of a state of statistical control by carefully designed experiments. While Shewhart drew from pure mathematical statistical theories, he understood that data from physical processes typically produce a "normal distribution curve" (a Gaussian distribution, also commonly referred to as a "bell curve"). He discovered that observed variation in manufacturing data did not always behave the same way as data in nature (Brownian motion of particles). Shewhart concluded that while every process displays variation, some processes display controlled variation that is natural to the process, while others display uncontrolled variation that is not present in the process causal system at all times.

In 1924, or 1925, Shewhart's innovation came to the attention of W. Edwards Deming, then working at the Hawthorne facility. Deming later worked at the United States Department of Agriculture and became the mathematical advisor to the United States Census Bureau. Over the next half a century, Deming became the foremost champion and proponent of Shewhart's work. After the defeat of Japan at the close of World War II, Deming served as statistical consultant to the Supreme Commander for the Allied Powers. His ensuing involvement in Japanese life, and long career as an industrial consultant there, spread Shewhart's thinking, and the use of the control chart, widely in Japanese manufacturing industry throughout the 1950s and 1960s.

Bonnie Small, a high school teacher in Oconomowoc, Wisconsin, read Shewhart's work and was inspired to employ control charts while working at her cousin's photography lab in Chicago. In 1942, she began working for Western Electric at their Hawthorne works in Cicero, her experience at the plant leading her to further refine the use of Shewhart's ideas. When General Electric opened a new plant in Allentown, PA to manufacture the newly developed transistor, Small was asked to supervise quality systems at the plant. She was asked by the company to form a committee for the purpose of codifying her approach to quality and in 1956, the committee published the first edition of The Western Electric Statistical Quality Control Handbook.

== Chart details ==
A control chart consists of:

- Points representing a statistic (e.g., a mean, range, proportion) of measurements of a quality characteristic in samples taken from the process at different times (i.e., the data)
- The mean of this statistic using all the samples is calculated (e.g., the mean of the means, mean of the ranges, mean of the proportions) - or for a reference period against which change can be assessed. Similarly a median can be used instead.
- A centre line is drawn at the value of the mean or median of the statistic
- The standard deviation (e.g., sqrt(variance) of the mean) of the statistic is calculated using all the samples - or again for a reference period against which change can be assessed. in the case of XmR charts, strictly it is an approximation of standard deviation, the does not make the assumption of homogeneity of process over time that the standard deviation makes.
- Upper and lower control limits (sometimes called "natural process limits") that indicate the threshold at which the process output is considered statistically 'unlikely' and are drawn typically at 3 standard deviations from the center line

The chart may have other optional features, including:

- More restrictive upper and lower warning or control limits, drawn as separate lines, typically two standard deviations above and below the center line. This is regularly used when a process needs tighter controls on variability.
- Division into zones, with the addition of rules governing frequencies of observations in each zone
- Annotation with events of interest, as determined by the Quality Engineer in charge of the process' quality
- Action on special causes

(n.b., there are several rule sets for detection of signal; this is just one set. The rule set should be clearly stated.)

1. Any point outside the control limits
2. A Run of 7 Points all above or all below the central line - Stop the production
  - Quarantine and 100% check
  - Adjust Process.
  - Check 5 Consecutive samples
  - Continue The Process.
3. A Run of 7 Point Up or Down - Instruction as above

=== Control chart constant ===
The control chart constant or bias correction factor are constants used in control charts. The constants are based on the subgroup size (n) and are derived from the statistical properties of sampling distributions. The first control chart constants proposed were d_{2} and d_{3}.

=== Chart usage ===
If the process is in control (and the process statistic is normal), 99.7300% of all the points will fall between the control limits. Any observations outside the limits, or systematic patterns within, suggest the introduction of a new (and likely unanticipated) source of variation, known as a special-cause variation. Since increased variation means increased quality costs, a control chart "signaling" the presence of a special-cause requires immediate investigation.

This makes the control limits very important decision aids. The control limits provide information about the process behavior and have no intrinsic relationship to any specification targets or engineering tolerance. In practice, the process mean (and hence the centre line) may not coincide with the specified value (or target) of the quality characteristic because the process design simply cannot deliver the process characteristic at the desired level.

Control charts limit specification limits or targets because of the tendency of those involved with the process (e.g., machine operators) to focus on performing to specification when in fact the least-cost course of action is to keep process variation as low as possible. Attempting to make a process whose natural centre is not the same as the target perform to target specification increases process variability and increases costs significantly and is the cause of much inefficiency in operations. Process capability studies do examine the relationship between the natural process limits (the control limits) and specifications, however.

The purpose of control charts is to allow simple detection of events that are indicative of an increase in process variability. This simple decision can be difficult where the process characteristic is continuously varying; the control chart provides statistically objective criteria of change. When change is detected and considered good its cause should be identified and possibly become the new way of working, where the change is bad then its cause should be identified and eliminated.

The purpose in adding warning limits or subdividing the control chart into zones is to provide early notification if something is amiss. Instead of immediately launching a process improvement effort to determine whether special causes are present, the Quality Engineer may temporarily increase the rate at which samples are taken from the process output until it is clear that the process is truly in control. Note that with three-sigma limits, common-cause variations result in signals less than once out of every twenty-two points for skewed processes and about once out of every three hundred seventy (1/370.4) points for normally distributed processes. The two-sigma warning levels will be reached about once for every twenty-two (1/21.98) plotted points in normally distributed data. (For example, the means of sufficiently large samples drawn from practically any underlying distribution whose variance exists are normally distributed, according to the Central Limit Theorem.)

=== Choice of limits ===
Shewhart set 3-sigma (3-standard deviation) limits on the following basis.

- The coarse result of Chebyshev's inequality that, for any probability distribution, the probability of an outcome greater than k standard deviations from the mean is at most 1/k^{2}.
- The finer result of the Vysochanskii–Petunin inequality, that for any unimodal probability distribution, the probability of an outcome greater than k standard deviations from the mean is at most 4/(9k^{2}).
- In the Normal distribution, a very common probability distribution, 99.7% of the observations occur within three standard deviations of the mean (see Normal distribution).

Shewhart summarized the conclusions by saying:

... the fact that the criterion which we happen to use has a fine ancestry in highbrow statistical theorems does not justify its use. Such justification must come from empirical evidence that it works. As the practical engineer might say, the proof of the pudding is in the eating.

Although he initially experimented with limits based on probability distributions, Shewhart ultimately wrote:

Some of the earliest attempts to characterize a state of statistical control were inspired by the belief that there existed a special form of frequency function f and it was early argued that the normal law characterized such a state. When the normal law was found to be inadequate, then generalized functional forms were tried. Today, however, all hopes of finding a unique functional form f are blasted.

The control chart is intended as a heuristic. Deming insisted that it is not a hypothesis test and is not motivated by the Neyman–Pearson lemma. He contended that the disjoint nature of population and sampling frame in most industrial situations compromised the use of conventional statistical techniques. Deming's intention was to seek insights into the cause system of a process ...under a wide range of unknowable circumstances, future and past.... He claimed that, under such conditions, 3-sigma limits provided ... a rational and economic guide to minimum economic loss... from the two errors:

1. Ascribe a variation or a mistake to a special cause (assignable cause) when in fact the cause belongs to the system (common cause). (Also known as a Type I error or False Positive)
2. Ascribe a variation or a mistake to the system (common causes) when in fact the cause was a special cause (assignable cause). (Also known as a Type II error or False Negative)

=== Calculation of standard deviation ===
As for the calculation of control limits, the standard deviation (error) required is that of the common-cause variation in the process. Hence, the usual estimator, in terms of sample variance, is not used as this estimates the total squared-error loss from both common- and special-causes of variation.

An alternative method is to use the relationship between the range of a sample and its standard deviation derived by Leonard H. C. Tippett, as an estimator which tends to be less influenced by the extreme observations which typify special-causes.

== Rules for detecting signals ==
The most common sets are:

- The Western Electric rules
- The Wheeler rules (equivalent to the Western Electric zone tests)
- The Nelson rules

There has been particular controversy as to how long a run of observations, all on the same side of the centre line, should count as a signal, with 6, 7, 8 and 9 all being advocated by various writers.

The most important principle for choosing a set of rules is that the choice be made before the data is inspected. Choosing rules once the data have been seen tends to increase the Type I error rate owing to testing effects suggested by the data.

== Alternative bases ==
In 1935, the British Standards Institution, under the influence of Egon Pearson and against Shewhart's spirit, adopted control charts, replacing 3-sigma limits with limits based on percentiles of the normal distribution. This move continues to be represented by John Oakland and others but has been widely deprecated by writers in the Shewhart–Deming tradition.

== Performance of control charts ==
When a point falls outside the limits established for a given control chart, those responsible for the underlying process are expected to determine whether a special cause has occurred. If one has, it is appropriate to determine if the results with the special cause are better than or worse than results from common causes alone. If worse, then that cause should be eliminated if possible. If better, it may be appropriate to intentionally retain the special cause within the system producing the results.

Even when a process is in control (that is, no special causes are present in the system), there is approximately a 0.27% probability of a point exceeding 3-sigma control limits. So, even an in control process plotted on a properly constructed control chart will eventually signal the possible presence of a special cause, even though one may not have actually occurred. For a Shewhart control chart using 3-sigma limits, this false alarm occurs on average once every 1/0.0027 or 370.4 observations. Therefore, the in-control average run length (or in-control ARL) of a Shewhart chart is 370.4.

Meanwhile, if a special cause does occur, it may not be of sufficient magnitude for the chart to produce an immediate alarm condition. If a special cause occurs, one can describe that cause by measuring the change in the mean and/or variance of the process in question. When those changes are quantified, it is possible to determine the out-of-control ARL for the chart.

It turns out that Shewhart charts are quite good at detecting large changes in the process mean or variance, as their out-of-control ARLs are fairly short in these cases. However, for smaller changes (such as a 1- or 2-sigma change in the mean), the Shewhart chart does not detect these changes efficiently. Other types of control charts have been developed, such as the EWMA chart, the CUSUM chart and the real-time contrasts chart, which detect smaller changes more efficiently by making use of information from observations collected prior to the most recent data point.

Many control charts work best for numeric data with Gaussian assumptions. The real-time contrasts chart was proposed to monitor process with complex characteristics, e.g. high-dimensional, mix numerical and categorical, missing-valued, non-Gaussian, non-linear relationship.

== Criticisms ==
Several authors have criticised the control chart on the grounds that it violates the likelihood principle. However, the principle is itself controversial and supporters of control charts further argue that, in general, it is impossible to specify a likelihood function for a process not in statistical control, especially where knowledge about the cause system of the process is weak.

Some authors have criticised the use of average run lengths (ARLs) for comparing control chart performance, because that average usually follows a geometric distribution, which has high variability and difficulties.

Some authors have criticized that most control charts focus on numeric data. Nowadays, process data can be much more complex, e.g. non-Gaussian, mix numerical and categorical, or be missing-valued.

== Types of charts ==
The International Organization for Standardization (ISO) has published the ISO 7870 series of standards covering control charts. These include general guidelines (ISO 7870-1), Shewhart control charts (ISO 7870-2), and cumulative sum (CUSUM) control charts (ISO 7870-4).

Chart	Process observation	Process observations relationships	Process observations type	Size of shift to detect
$\bar x$ and R chart	Quality characteristic measurement within one subgroup	Independent	Variables	Large (≥ 1.5σ)
$\bar x$ and s chart	Quality characteristic measurement within one subgroup	Independent	Variables	Large (≥ 1.5σ)
Shewhart individuals control chart (ImR chart or XmR chart)	Quality characteristic measurement for one observation	Independent	Variables^{†}	Large (≥ 1.5σ)
Three-way chart	Quality characteristic measurement within one subgroup	Independent	Variables	Large (≥ 1.5σ)
p-chart	Fraction nonconforming within one subgroup	Independent	Attributes^{†}	Large (≥ 1.5σ)
np-chart	Number nonconforming within one subgroup	Independent	Attributes^{†}	Large (≥ 1.5σ)
c-chart	Number of nonconformances within one subgroup	Independent	Attributes^{†}	Large (≥ 1.5σ)
u-chart	Nonconformances per unit within one subgroup	Independent	Attributes^{†}	Large (≥ 1.5σ)
EWMA chart	Exponentially weighted moving average of quality characteristic measurement within one subgroup	Independent	Attributes or variables	Small (< 1.5σ)
CUSUM chart	Cumulative sum of quality characteristic measurement within one subgroup	Independent	Attributes or variables	Small (< 1.5σ)
Time series model	Quality characteristic measurement within one subgroup	Autocorrelated	Attributes or variables	N/A
Regression control chart	Quality characteristic measurement within one subgroup	Dependent of process control variables	Variables	Large (≥ 1.5σ)

^{†}Some practitioners also recommend the use of Individuals charts for attribute data, particularly when the assumptions of either binomially distributed data (p- and np-charts) or Poisson-distributed data (u- and c-charts) are violated. Two primary justifications are given for this practice. First, normality is not necessary for statistical control, so the Individuals chart may be used with non-normal data. Second, attribute charts derive the measure of dispersion directly from the mean proportion (by assuming a probability distribution), while Individuals charts derive the measure of dispersion from the data, independent of the mean, making Individuals charts more robust than attributes charts to violations of the assumptions about the distribution of the underlying population. It is sometimes noted that the substitution of the Individuals chart works best for large counts, when the binomial and Poisson distributions approximate a normal distribution. i.e. when the number of trials n > 1000 for p- and np-charts or λ > 500 for u- and c-charts.

Critics of this approach argue that control charts should not be used when their underlying assumptions are violated, such as when process data is neither normally distributed nor binomially (or Poisson) distributed. Such processes are not in control and should be improved before the application of control charts. Additionally, application of the charts in the presence of such deviations increases the type I and type II error rates of the control charts, and may make the chart of little practical use.

== See also ==
- Analytic and enumerative statistical studies
- Common cause and special cause
- Process capability
- Seven Basic Tools of Quality
- Six Sigma
- Statistical process control
- Total quality management

== Bibliography ==
- Deming, W. E. (1975). "On probability as a basis for action". The American Statistician. 29 (4): 146–152. doi:10.2307/2683482. JSTOR 2683482.
- Deming, W. E. (1982). Out of the Crisis: Quality, Productivity and Competitive Position. ISBN 978-0-521-30553-2.
- Deng, H.; Runger, G.; Tuv, Eugene (2012). "System monitoring with real-time contrasts". Journal of Quality Technology. 44 (1): 9–27. doi:10.1080/00224065.2012.11917878. S2CID 119835984.
- Mandel, B. J. (1969). "The Regression Control Chart". Journal of Quality Technology. 1 (1): 1–9. doi:10.1080/00224065.1969.11980341.
- Oakland, J. (2002). Statistical Process Control. ISBN 978-0-7506-5766-2.
- Shewhart, W. A. (1931). Economic Control of Quality of Manufactured Product. American Society for Quality Control. ISBN 978-0-87389-076-2.
- Shewhart, W. A. (1939). Statistical Method from the Viewpoint of Quality Control. Courier Corporation. ISBN 978-0-486-65232-0.
- Wheeler, D. J. (2000). Normality and the Process-Behaviour Chart. SPC Press. ISBN 978-0-945320-56-2.
- Wheeler, D. J.; Chambers, D. S. (1992). Understanding Statistical Process Control. SPC Press. ISBN 978-0-945320-13-5.
- Wheeler, Donald J. (1999). Understanding Variation: The Key to Managing Chaos (2nd ed.). SPC Press. ISBN 978-0-945320-53-1.
