= Walter A. Shewhart =

American statistical quality control pioneer (1891-1967)

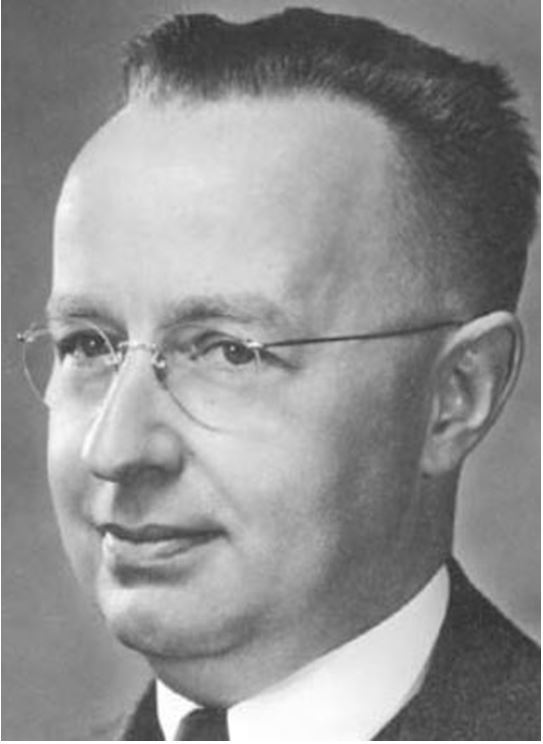
- Shewhart in April 1920
- Born: March 18, 1891; New Canton, Illinois, U.S.
- Died: March 11, 1967 (aged 75); Troy Hills, New Jersey, U.S.
- Education: University of Illinois, University of California, Berkeley
- Known for: Shewhart chart Shewhart cycle statistical quality control
- Scientific career
- Workplaces: University of Wisconsin–La Crosse; Western Electric; Bell Labs
- Thesis: A study of the accelerated motion of small drops through a viscous medium (1917)

Walter Andrew Shewhart (pronounced like "shoe-heart"; March 18, 1891 – March 11, 1967) was an American physicist, engineer and statistician. He is sometimes also known as the grandfather of statistical quality control, inventor of the Shewhart chart and the Shewhart cycle.

W. Edwards Deming said of him:

As a statistician, he was, like so many of the rest of us, self-taught, on a good background of physics and mathematics.

== Education and career ==
Born in New Canton, Illinois to Anton and Esta Barney Shewhart, he attended the University of Illinois at Urbana–Champaign before being awarded his doctorate in physics from the University of California, Berkeley in 1917. He married Edna Elizabeth Hart, daughter of William Nathaniel and Isabelle "Ibie" Lippencott Hart on August 4, 1914 in Pike County, Illinois.

After graduation from Berkeley, Shewhart became an assistant at the University of Illinois. From 1917 to 1918, he was the head of the department of physics at the Wisconsin Normal School (now University of Wisconsin–La Crosse). In 1918, he joined Western Electric, which manufactures hardware for the Bell Telephone Company. He later joined the newly founded Bell Labs in 1925 and worked there until his retirement in 1956.

== Work on industrial quality ==
Bell Telephone’s engineers had been working to improve the reliability of their transmission systems. In order to impress government regulators of this natural monopoly with the high quality of their service, Shewhart's first assignment was to improve the voice clarity of the carbon transmitters in the company's telephone handsets. Later he applied his statistical methods to the final installation of central station switching systems, then to factory production. When Shewhart joined the Western Electric Company Inspection Engineering Department at the Hawthorne Works in 1918, industrial quality was limited to inspecting finished products and removing defective items. That all changed on May 16, 1924. Shewhart's boss, George D. Edwards, recalled: "Dr. Shewhart prepared a little memorandum only about a page in length. About a third of that page was given over to a simple diagram which we would all recognize today as a schematic control chart. That diagram, and the short text which preceded and followed it, set forth all of the essential principles and considerations which are involved in what we know today as process quality control." Shewhart's work pointed out the importance of reducing variation in a manufacturing process and the understanding that continual process-adjustment in reaction to non-conformance actually increased variation and degraded quality.

Shewhart framed the problem in terms of assignable-cause and chance-cause variation and introduced the control chart as a tool for distinguishing between the two. Shewhart stressed that bringing a production process into a state of statistical control, where there is only chance-cause variation, and keeping it in control, is necessary to predict future output and to manage a process economically. Dr. Shewhart created the basis for the control chart and the concept of a state of statistical control by carefully designed experiments. While Dr. Shewhart drew from pure mathematical statistical theories, he understood data from physical processes never produce a "normal distribution curve" (a Gaussian distribution, also commonly called a "bell curve"). He discovered that observed variation in manufacturing data did not always behave the same way as data in nature (Brownian motion of particles). Dr. Shewhart concluded that while every process displays variation, some processes display controlled variation that is natural to the process, while others display uncontrolled variation that is not present in the process causal system at all times.

Shewhart worked to advance the thinking at Bell Telephone Laboratories from their foundation in 1925 until his retirement in 1956, publishing a series of papers in the Bell System Technical Journal.

His work was summarized in his book Economic Control of Quality of Manufactured Product (1931).

Shewhart's charts were adopted by the American Society for Testing and Materials (ASTM) in 1933 and advocated to improve production during World War II in American War Standards Z1.1–1941, Z1.2-1941 and Z1.3-1942.

== Later work ==
From the late 1930s onwards, Shewhart's interests expanded out from industrial quality to wider concerns in science and statistical inference. The title of his second book, Statistical Method from the Viewpoint of Quality Control (1939), asks the question: "What can statistical practice, and science in general, learn from the experience of industrial quality control?"

Shewhart's approach to statistics was radically different from that of many of his contemporaries. He possessed a strong operationalist outlook, largely absorbed from the writings of pragmatist philosopher Clarence Irving Lewis, and this influenced his statistical practice. In particular, he had read Lewis' Mind and the World Order many times. Though he lectured in England in 1932 under the sponsorship of Karl Pearson (another committed operationalist) his ideas attracted little enthusiasm within the English statistical tradition. The British Standards nominally based on his work, in fact, diverge on serious philosophical and methodological issues from his practice.

His more conventional work led him to formulate the statistical idea of tolerance intervals and to propose his data presentation rules, which are listed below:

1. Data have no meaning apart from their context.
2. Data contain both signal and noise. To be able to extract information, one must separate the signal from the noise within the data.

Shewhart visited India in 1947–1948 under the sponsorship of P. C. Mahalanobis of the Indian Statistical Institute. He toured the country, held conferences and stimulated interest in statistical quality control among Indian industrialists.

He died at Troy Hills, New Jersey in 1967.

== Influence ==
In 1938 his work came to the attention of physicists W. Edwards Deming and Raymond T. Birge. The two had been deeply intrigued by the issue of measurement error in science and had published a landmark paper in Reviews of Modern Physics in 1934. On reading of Shewhart's insights, they wrote to the journal to wholly recast their approach in the terms that Shewhart advocated.

The encounter began a long collaboration between Shewhart and Deming that involved work on productivity during World War II and Deming's championing of Shewhart's ideas in Japan from 1950 onwards. Deming developed some of Shewhart's methodological proposals around scientific inference and named his synthesis the Shewhart cycle that later became The PDSA Cycle.

To celebrate his quasquicentennial (125th) birth anniversary, the journal Quality Technology and Quantitative Management (ISSN 1684-3703) published a special issue in on "Advances in the Theory and Application of Statistical Process Control".

== Achievements and honours ==
In his obituary for the American Statistical Association, Deming wrote of Shewhart:

As a man, he was gentle, genteel, never ruffled, never off his dignity. He knew disappointment and frustration, through failure of many writers in mathematical statistics to understand his point of view.

He was founding editor of the Wiley Series in Mathematical Statistics, a role that he maintained for twenty years, always championing freedom of speech and confident to publish views at variance with his own.

His honours included:

- Founding member, fellow and president of the Institute of Mathematical Statistics;
- Founding member, first honorary member and first Shewhart Medalist of the American Society for Quality;
- Fellow and President of the American Statistical Association;
- Fellow of the International Statistical Institute;
- Honorary fellow of the Royal Statistical Society;
- Holley medal of the American Society of Mechanical Engineers;
- Honorary Doctor of Science, Indian Statistical Institute, Calcutta.

== Works ==
- 1917: A Study of the Accelerated Motion of Small Drops through a Viscous Medium, Ph.D. dissertation via HathiTrust
- — (1931). Economic Control of Quality of Manufactured Product. New York: D. Van Nostrand Company, Inc. OCLC 1045408.
- — (1939). Deming, W. Edwards (ed.). Statistical Method from the Viewpoint of Quality Control. Washington: The Graduate School, US Dept. of Agriculture. OCLC 1249225.

== See also ==
- Control chart
- Common cause and special cause (statistics)
- Analytic and enumerative statistical studies
