= Variable and attribute (research) =

Science and research term

In science and research, an attribute is a quality of an object (person, thing, etc.). Attributes are closely related to variables. A variable is a logical set of attributes. Variables can "vary" – for example, be high or low. How high, or how low, is determined by the value of the attribute (and in fact, an attribute could be just the word "low" or "high"). (For example see: Binary option)

While an attribute is often intuitive, the variable is the operationalized way in which the attribute is represented for further data processing. In data processing data are often represented by a combination of items (objects organized in rows), and multiple variables (organized in columns).

Values of each variable statistically "vary" (or are distributed) across the variable's domain. A domain is a set of all possible values that a variable is allowed to have. The values are ordered in a logical way and must be defined for each variable. Domains can be bigger or smaller. The smallest possible domains have those variables that can only have two values, also called binary (or dichotomous) variables. Bigger domains have non-dichotomous variables and the ones with a higher level of measurement. (See also domain of discourse.)

Semantically, greater precision can be obtained when considering an object's characteristics by distinguishing 'attributes' (characteristics that are attributed to an object) from 'traits' (characteristics that are inherent to the object).

== Examples ==
Age is an attribute that can be operationalized in many ways. It can be dichotomized so that only two values – "old" and "young" – are allowed for further data processing. In this case the attribute "age" is operationalized as a binary variable. If more than two values are possible and they can be ordered, the attribute is represented by ordinal variable, such as "young", "middle age", and "old". Next it can be made of rational values, such as 1, 2, 3.... 99.

The "social class" attribute can be operationalized in similar ways as age, including "lower", "middle" and "upper class" and each class could be differentiated between upper and lower, transforming thus changing the three attributes into six (see the model proposed by William Lloyd Warner) or it could use different terminology (such as the working class as in the model by Gilbert and Kahl).

== See also ==
- Qualitative data
- Quantitative data
- Control variable
- Dependent and independent variables
