= DMAIC =

Data-driven improvement cycle used for improving and optimizing business processes

DMAIC or define, measure, analyze, improve and control (pronounced də-MAY-ick) refers to a data-driven improvement cycle used for optimizing and stabilizing business processes and designs. The DMAIC improvement cycle is the core tool used to drive Six Sigma projects. However, DMAIC is not exclusive to Six Sigma and can be used as the framework for other improvement applications.

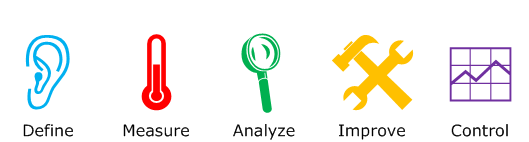
The five steps of DMAIC

== Steps ==
DMAIC is an abbreviation of the five improvement steps it comprises: Define, measure, analyze, improve and control. All of the DMAIC process steps are required and always proceed in the given order.

=== Define ===
The purpose of this step is to clearly pronounce the business problem, goal, potential resources, project scope, and high-level project timeline. This information is typically captured within the project charter document. At this stage, what is currently known is written down, one seeks to clarify facts, set objectives and form the project team. The following are to be defined:

- A problem
- The customer(s), SIPOC
- Voice of the customer (VOC) and critical to quality (CTQs) — what are the critical process outputs?

=== Measure ===
The purpose of this step is to measure the specification of problem/goal. This is a data collection step, the purpose of which is to establish process performance baselines. The performance metric baseline(s) from the Measure phase will be compared to the performance metric at the conclusion of the project to determine objectively whether significant improvement has been made. The team decides on what should be measured and how to measure it. It is usual for teams to invest a lot of effort into assessing the suitability of the proposed measurement systems. Good data is at the heart of the DMAIC process.

=== Analyze ===
The purpose of this step is to identify, validate and select a root cause for elimination. A large number of potential root causes (process inputs, X) of the project problem are identified via root cause analysis (for example, a fishbone diagram). The top three to four potential root causes are selected using multi-voting or other consensus tool for further validation. A data collection plan is created and data are collected to establish the relative contribution of each root causes to the project metric (Y). This process is repeated until "valid" root causes can be identified. Within Six Sigma, often complex analysis tools are used. However, it is acceptable to use basic tools if these are appropriate. Of the "validated" root causes, all or some can be.

- List and prioritize potential causes of the problem
- Prioritize the root causes (key process inputs) to pursue in the Improve step
- Identify how the process inputs (Xs) affect the process outputs (Ys). Data are analyzed to understand the magnitude of contribution of each root cause (X) to the project metric (Y). Statistical tests using p-values accompanied by Histograms, Pareto charts, and line plots are often used to do this.
- Detailed process maps can be created to help pin-point where in the process the root causes reside, and what might be contributing to the occurrence.

=== Improve ===
The purpose of this step is to identify, test and implement a solution to the problem, either in part or as a whole depending on the situation. Identify creative solutions to eliminate the key root causes in order to fix and prevent process problems. One can use brainstorming or techniques like six thinking hats and random word. Some projects can utilize complex analysis tools like design of experiments (DOE), but try to focus on obvious solutions if these are apparent. However, the purpose of this step can also be to find solutions without implementing them.

- Create
- Focus on the simplest and easiest solutions
- Test solutions using plan-do-check-act (PDCA) cycle
- Based on PDCA results, attempt to anticipate any avoidable risks associated with the "improvement" using failure mode and effects analysis (FMEA)
- Create a detailed implementation plan
- Deploy improvements

=== Control ===
The purpose of this step is to embed the changes and ensure sustainability, this is sometimes referred to as making the change 'stick'. Control is the final stage within the DMAIC improvement method. In this step, the following processes are undertaken: amend ways of working, quantify and sign-off benefits, track improvement, officially close the project, and gain approval to release resources.

- A control chart can be useful during the Control stage to assess the stability of the improvements over time by 1. serving as a guide to continue monitoring the process and 2. providing a response plan for each of the measures being monitored in case the process becomes unstable.
- Standard operating procedures (SOPs) and Standard work
- Process confirmation
- Development plans
- Transition plans
- Control plan
- Benefit delivery

== Criticisms ==
One common criticism of DMAIC is that it is ineffective as a communication framework. Many improvement practitioners attempt to use the same DMAIC process, effective in solving the problem, as a framework for communication only to leave the audience confused and frustrated. One proposed solution to this problem is reorganizing the DMAIC information using the Minto Pyramid Principle's SCQA and MECE tools. The result is a framed solution supported by easy-to-follow logic.

== Additional steps ==
Some organizations add a Recognize step at the beginning, thus yielding an RDMAIC methodology.

=== Replicate and thank the teams ===
This is additional to the standard DMAIC steps but it should be considered. Think about replicating the changes in other processes. Share new knowledge within and outside of the organization. It is very important to always provide positive morale support to team members in an effort to maximize the effectiveness of DMAIC.

Replicating the improvements, sharing successes and thanking team members helps build buy-in for future DMAIC or improvement initiatives.

== See also ==
- Design for Six Sigma (DFSS)
- Industrial engineering
- Kaizen
- PDCA (plan, do, check, act)
- Six Sigma
- BADIR
