= Minitab =

Statistics software

- Original authors: Barbara F. Ryan, Thomas A. Ryan, Jr., and Brian L. Joiner
- Developers: Minitab, LLC
- Release: 1972
- Stable release: 22.5.2 / September 9, 2026; 27 days ago
- Operating system: Windows, web app, formerly: Mac
- Type: Statistical analysis
- License: Trialware
- Website: minitab.com

Minitab is a software company that develops statistical analysis and process improvement software. Developed at the Pennsylvania State University by researchers Barbara F. Ryan, Thomas A. Ryan, Jr., and Brian L. Joiner in conjunction with Triola Statistics Company in 1972, the company has expanded into a global provider of analytics solutions used in manufacturing, hospitality, food and beverage, pharmaceuticals, healthcare, mining, education, and other sectors.

== History ==
During the 1990s, the software became associated with Six Sigma and other structured quality improvement initiatives, and it has been used in university courses related to Lean Six Sigma and quality engineering. Minitab is distributed by Minitab, LLC, a privately owned company headquartered in State College, Pennsylvania. As of 2026, Minitab LLC had subsidiaries in the Netherlands, UK, France, Germany, Hong Kong, Japan, South Korea, and Australia.

== Industry and academic use ==
Minitab software is commonly used in quality engineering, industrial statistics, and Six Sigma initiatives. Its integration into Lean Six Sigma programs and engineering curricula reflects its continued use in academic and professional training.

== Products ==
Minitab’s primary product is Minitab Statistical Software and the Minitab Solution Center, a cloud-based platform that provides centralized access to the company's statistical analysis, data preparation, visualization, and process improvement tools. The platform consolidates multiple analytics applications within a unified environment intended to support problem-solving workflows from idea generation to data analysis and dashboard visualization.

The software includes statistical capabilities such as hypothesis testing, regression analysis, analysis of variance (ANOVA), statistical process control (SPC), and design of experiments (DOE).

Through internal development and acquisitions, Minitab has expanded its product ecosystem to include predictive analytics, discrete-event simulation, real-time manufacturing data integration, and advanced experimental optimization tools.

== Expansion and acquisitions ==
Beginning in the 2010s, Minitab expanded beyond traditional desktop statistical software through acquisitions intended to broaden its analytics capabilities.

In 2017, Minitab acquired Salford Systems, a predictive analytics company known for implementing decision tree methodologies including CART and Random forest algorithms.

In December 2024, Minitab acquired Simul8 Corporation, a Scotland-based developer of discrete-event simulation software. The software is used to model operational systems such as manufacturing processes, healthcare delivery systems, and service workflows.

In 2025, the company acquired Prolink Software, which develops automated quality data collection systems that connect inspection and measurement devices directly to statistical process control platforms.

In 2026, Minitab acquired Scytec, whose DataXchange platform collects real-time operational data from industrial equipment including CNC machines, programmable logic controllers (PLCs), and robotic systems.

Additionally in 2026, Minitab acquired Effex, a software platform focused on modern design of experiments (DOE). Effex includes a catalog of experimental designs and uses algorithmic and artificial intelligence-assisted methods to generate optimized experimental plans.

In July 2026, Minitab acquired DataLabs (formerly Eretec), a South Korean data-analysis and consulting company that had supplied and supported Minitab software in the country for more than 25 years. DataLabs retained its name, and its employees joined Minitab following the acquisition.

== Artificial intelligence features ==
Minitab has introduced features intended to assist users in selecting statistical methods and interpreting analytical output. In 2015, the company introduced an "Analysis Assistant" feature designed to guide users in choosing appropriate statistical tests and understanding results.

Later versions of the software added an AI-based assistant that provides natural-language explanations of statistical output produced within the software environment. According to company documentation, these features generate explanations based on validated analytical results produced by the software rather than independent generative outputs.

== International operations ==
Minitab LLC is headquartered in State College, Pennsylvania, United States. The company also maintains a U.S. office in Chicago, Illinois.

International offices include locations in Coventry, United Kingdom; Paris, France; Munich, Germany; Hilversum, Netherlands; Hong Kong; Tokyo, Japan; Sydney, Australia; and South Korea.

In 2026, Minitab expanded its operations in South Korea through the acquisition of DataLabs.

== Recognition ==
In 2025, Minitab received the Manufacturing Today Manufacturing Supplier Innovation Award in the category of Most Innovative Quality Control and Assurance Solution.

In 2026, Minitab Statistical Software was ranked among the Top 50 Best Data Analytics Software Products in G2’s Best Software Awards, based on user ratings and reviews on the G2 marketplace.

Fast Company included Minitab in its 2026 Best Workplaces for Innovators recognition and named the company among those recognized in the AI, automation, and machine learning excellence category.

The 2026 ISG Software Innovation Awards for North America named Minitab the winner of its Industries Award.

== Leadership ==
Jeffrey T. Slovin is chief executive officer of Minitab.

== See also ==
- List of statistical packages
- Comparison of statistical packages
