= Process performance index =

In process improvement efforts, the process performance index is an estimate of the process capability of a process during its initial set-up, before it has been brought into a state of statistical control.

Formally, if the upper and lower specifications of the process are USL and LSL, the estimated mean of the process is $\hat{\mu}$, and the estimated variability of the process (expressed as a standard deviation) is $\hat{\sigma}$, then the process performance index is defined as:

$$\hat{P}_{pk} = \min \Bigg[ {USL - \hat{\mu} \over 3 \hat{\sigma}}, { \hat{\mu} - LSL \over 3 \hat{\sigma}} \Bigg]$$

$\hat{\sigma}$ is estimated using the sample standard deviation. P_{pk} may be negative if the process mean falls outside the specification limits (because the process is producing a large proportion of defective output).

Some specifications may only be one sided (for example, strength). For specifications that only have a lower limit, $\hat{P}_{p,lower} = {\hat{\mu} - LSL \over 3 \hat{\sigma}}$; for those that only have an upper limit, $\hat{P}_{p,upper} = {USL - \hat{\mu} \over 3 \hat{\sigma}}$.

Practitioners may also encounter $\hat{P}_{p} = \frac{USL - LSL} {6 \hat{\sigma}}$, a metric that does not account for process performance not exactly centered between the specification limits, and therefore is interpreted as what the process would be capable of achieving if it could be centered and stabilized.

== Interpretation ==
Larger values of P_{pk} may be interpreted to indicate that a process is more capable of producing output within the specification limits, though this interpretation is controversial. Strictly speaking, from a statistical standpoint, P_{pk} is meaningless if the process under study is not in control because one cannot reliably estimate the process underlying probability distribution, let alone parameters like $\hat{\mu}$ and $\hat{\sigma}$. Furthermore, using this metric of past process performance to predict future performance is highly suspect.

From a management standpoint, when an organization is under pressure to set up a new process quickly and economically, P_{pk} is a convenient metric to gauge how set-up is progressing (increasing P_{pk} being interpreted as "the process capability is improving"). The risk is that P_{pk} is taken to mean a process is ready for production before all the kinks have been worked out of it.

Once a process is put into a state of statistical control, process capability is described using process capability indices, which are formulaically identical to P_{pk} (and P_{p}). The indices are named differently in order to call attention to whether the process under study is believed to be in control or not.

== Example ==
Consider a quality characteristic with a target of 100.00 μm and upper and lower specification limits of 106.00 μm and 94.00 μm, respectively. If, after carefully monitoring the process for a while, it appears that the process is out of control and producing output unpredictably (as depicted in the run chart below), one can't meaningfully estimate its mean and standard deviation. In the example below, the process mean appears to drift upward, settle for a while, and then drift downward.

If $\hat{\mu}$ and $\hat{\sigma}$ are estimated to be 99.61 μm and 1.84 μm, respectively, then

Index
$\hat{P}_p = \frac{USL - LSL} {6 \hat{\sigma}} = \frac{106.00 - 94.00} {6 \times 1.84} = 1.09$
$\hat{P}_{pk} = \min \Bigg[ {USL - \hat{\mu} \over 3 \hat{\sigma}}, { \hat{\mu} - LSL \over 3 \hat{\sigma}} \Bigg] = \min \Bigg[ {106.00 - 99.61 \over 3 \times 1.84}, { 99.61 - 94 \over 3 \times 1.84} \Bigg] = 1.02$

That the process mean appears to be unstable is reflected in the relatively low values for P_{p} and P_{pk}. The process is producing a significant number of defectives, and, until the cause of the unstable process mean is identified and eliminated, one really can't meaningfully quantify how this process will perform.

== See also ==
- Process (engineering)
- Process capability
- Process capability index
