= Critical to X =

Critical to x (CTx) is a Design for Six Sigma approach that refers to the key factors that are essential for the successful completion of a project or process.

These factors may be identified through a CTX tree.

== Critical to X factors ==
The following is a list of Critical to X factors:

- Critical to quality (CTQ)
  - CTQ tree
- Critical to cost (CTC)
- Critical to process (CTP)
- Critical to safety (CTS)
- Critical to delivery (CTD)
