= Byung Man Kwak =

Mechanical engineer and academic

- Occupations: Mechanical engineer and academic
- Awards: Korea Engineering Award, a Presidential Award (2005)

Academic background
- Education: B.S., Mechanical Engineering; M.S., Mechanical Engineering; Ph.D., Mechanical Engineering
- Alma mater: Seoul National University; University of Iowa

Academic work
- Institutions: Korea Advanced Institute of Science and Technology

Byung Man Kwak (Korean: 곽병만; born February 14, 1945) is a mechanical engineer and academic who is professor emeritus at the Korea Advanced Institute of Science and Technology.

Kwak's research primarily focuses on optimization and optimal design in mechanical structures. He received the Korea Engineering Award in 2005, a presidential award, and is a fellow of both the American Society of Mechanical Engineers and the Korean Academy of Science and Technology.

== Education ==
Kwak earned his bachelor's degree in mechanical engineering from Seoul National University in 1967, followed by a master's degree in mechanical engineering from the same institution in 1971. He then completed his Ph.D. in mechanical engineering at the University of Iowa in 1974.

== Career ==
Kwak began his career as a signal officer in the Korean Army, serving from 1967 to 1969. In 1977, he joined the Korea Advanced Institute of Science and Technology (KAIST) as a professor and later served as the Samsung Distinguished Professor from 1997 to 2015. From 1981 to 1982, he was a special project associate at the Mayo Clinic. At KAIST, he was dean of the College of Engineering from 2000 to 2001 and director of the Mobile Harbor Project from 2009 to 2015. In 2001, he was also appointed president of the Korean Society of Mechanical Engineers. He currently holds the title of professor emeritus at KAIST.

== Research ==
Kwak's research centers on optimization theory and its applications in engineering and biomechanics. In biomechanics, he developed an optimization-based method to address muscle force distribution during flexion, employing min-max formulations to reduce muscle stress with the aid of electromyographic data. He has also formulated three-dimensional frictional contact problems as nonlinear complementarity problems, facilitating numerical analysis.

Kwak's contributions also extend to theories of shape sensitivity through boundary integral equations and to design-space optimization, where the size of the design domain itself becomes a variable. He introduced the Advanced First Order and Second Moment (AFOSM) approach, a performance-measure framework applied in reliability analysis. In collaboration with colleagues, he helped develop and optimize a cantilever-type piezoelectric energy harvester that converts rotary motion into electrical energy, using design optimization to improve power output.

Kwak's later research explored probabilistic design methods, proposing a propagation technique based on a design of experiments framework to handle non-normal distributions through weighted three-level schemes. He applied Gauss-type quadrature formulas to compute statistical moments of system responses with fewer samples in low-dimensional uncertainty cases. His additional research includes the design and application of adjustable threshold accelerometers, microswitch mechanisms, and the design optimization of mechanical systems accounting for link-length tolerances and joint clearances.

== Awards and honors ==
- 1992 – Korea Order of Civil Merit (Seogryu Medal), Government of the Republic of Korea
- 1994 – Fellow, American Society of Mechanical Engineers
- 1994 – Fellow, Korean Academy of Science and Technology
- 2005 – Korea Engineering Award, President of the Republic of Korea
- Senior Member, National Academy of Engineering of Korea (NAEK)
- 2018 – General Electric Aviation Assemblies Innovation Challenge Winner, GE Aviation

== Selected articles ==
- An, Kai-Nan; Kwak, Byung Man; Chao, Edward Yuan-Chun; Morrey, Bernard F. (November 1984). "Determination of muscle and joint forces: A new technique to solve the indeterminate problem". Journal of Biomechanical Engineering. 106 (4): 364–367. doi:10.1115/1.3138507. PMID 6513533.
- Choi, Joo Ho; Kwak, Byung Man (1988). "Boundary integral equation method for shape optimization of elastic structures". International Journal for Numerical Methods in Engineering. 26 (7): 1579–1595. Bibcode:1988IJNME..26.1579C. doi:10.1002/nme.1620260709.
- Seo, Hyun Seok; Kwak, Byung Man (2002). "Efficient statistical tolerance analysis for general distributions using three-point information". International Journal of Production Research. 40 (4): 931–944. doi:10.1080/00207540110095709.
- Lee, Sang Hoon; Kwak, Byung Man (2006). "Response surface augmented moment method for efficient reliability analysis". Structural Safety. 28 (3): 261–272. doi:10.1016/j.strusafe.2005.08.003.
- Park, Juil; Lee, Soobum; Kwak, Byung Man (2012). "Design optimization of piezoelectric energy harvester subject to tip excitation". Journal of Mechanical Science and Technology. 26 (1): 137–143. doi:10.1007/s12206-011-0910-1.
