= Design engineer =

Engineer or technician involved in the planning of technical systems

A design engineer is an engineer focused on the engineering design process in any of the various engineering disciplines (including civil, mechanical, electrical, chemical, textiles, aerospace, nuclear, manufacturing, systems, structural, building, andarchitectural) and design disciplines like human-computer interaction. Design engineers tend to work on products and systems that involve adapting and using complex scientific and mathematical techniques. The emphasis tends to be on utilizing engineering physics and other applied sciences to develop solutions for society.

A design engineer usually works with a team of other engineers and other types of designers (e.g. industrial designers) to develop conceptual and detailed designs that ensure a product functions, performs, and is fit for its purpose. They may also work with marketers to develop the product concept and specifications to meet customer needs, and may direct the design effort. In many engineering areas, a distinction is made between the "design engineer" and other engineering roles (e.g. planning engineer, project engineer, test engineer). Analysis tends to play a larger role for the latter areas, while synthesis is more paramount for the former; nevertheless, all such roles are technically part of the overall engineering design process.

When an engineering project involves public safety, design engineers involved are often required to be licensed – for example, as a professional engineer (in the U.S. and Canada). There are often "industrial exemptions" to licensing for engineers working on projects which are solely internal to their organization, although the scope and conditions of such exemptions vary widely across jurisdictions.

== Design engineer tasks ==
Design engineers may work in teams with other designers to create drawings necessary for prototyping and production, or in the case of buildings, for construction. However, with the advent of CAD and solid modeling software, the design engineers may create the drawings themselves, or perhaps with the help of many corporate service providers.

The next responsibility of many design engineers is prototyping. A model of the product is created and reviewed. Prototypes are either functional or non-functional. Functional "alpha" prototypes are used for testing; non-functional prototypes are used for form and fit checking. Virtual prototyping and hence for any such software solutions may also be used. This stage is where design flaws are found and corrected, and tooling, manufacturing fixtures, and packaging are developed.

Once the "alpha" prototype is finalized after many iterations, the next step is the "beta" pre-production prototype. The design engineer, working with an industrial engineer, manufacturing engineer, and quality engineer, reviews an initial run of components and assemblies for design compliance and fabrication/manufacturing methods analysis. This is often determined through statistical process control. Variations in the product are correlated to aspects of the process and eliminated. The most common metric used is the process capability index C_{pk}. A C_{pk} of 1.0 is considered the baseline acceptance for full production go-ahead.

The design engineer may follow the product and make requested changes and corrections throughout the whole life of the product. This is referred to as "cradle-to- grave" engineering. The design engineer works closely with the manufacturing engineer throughout the product life cycle, and is often required to investigate and validate design changes which could lead to possible production cost reductions in order to consistently reduce the price as the product becomes mature and thus subject to discounting to defend market volumes against newer competing products. Moreover, design changes may be also made mandatory by updates in laws and regulations.

The design process is an information intensive one. A 2010 study found that design engineers spend 56% of their time engaged in various information behaviours, including 14% actively searching for information. In addition to design engineers' core technical competence, research has demonstrated the critical nature of their personal attributes, project management skills, and cognitive abilities to succeed in the role.

Amongst other more detailed findings, a 2012 work sampling study found that design engineers spend 62.92% of their time engaged in technical work, 40.37% in social work, and 49.66% in computer-based work. There was considerable overlap between these different types of work, with engineers spending 24.96% of their time engaged in technical and social work, 37.97% in technical and non-social, 15.42% in non-technical and social, and 21.66% in non-technical and non-social.

== In software engineering ==
In software engineering, a design engineer is a person with the skills to tackle both design and software development tasks. As Maggie Appleton puts it, "a person who sits squarely at the intersection of design and engineering, and works to bridge the gap between them". Some of their main tasks include prototyping and designing in code.

Related terms for design engineers in the software engineering industry include:

- UX engineer
- UI engineer
- Design technologist
- Creative technologist
- Design system architect
- Product designer
- Experience designer

== Categories ==
- Architectural design
- Automotive design
- Building information modeling
- CAD technician
- Computer-aided engineering
- Computer-aided industrial design
- Computer-aided manufacturing
- Design for additive manufacturing
- Ergonomic design
- Industrial design engineering
- Integrated circuit design
- Interior architect
- Mechanical, electrical, and plumbing (MEP)
- Naval architecture
- Packaging engineering
- Printed circuit board design
- Systems engineering design
- User experience design (UX)
- User interface design (UI)

== See also ==
- Architectural engineering, also known as building engineering
- Carnegie Mellon IDeATe – Integrative Design, Arts, and Technology Network, and manages the Entertainment Technology Center.
- Chemical engineering
- Civil engineering
- Digital twin
- Electrical engineering
- Gnomon School of Visual Effects
- Industrial engineering
- List of 3D modeling software
- List of BIM software
- List of computer-aided manufacturing software
- List of computer-aided engineering software
- List of engineering branches
- Manufacturing engineering
- Mechanical engineering
- New product development
- Production engineering
- Test engineer
- Tool engineering
