= Abadir (disambiguation) =

Abadir may refer to:

- Abadir Umar ar-Rida, the legendary ancestor of the Harari people of Ethiopia
- Abadir (Christian saint), supposedly beheaded in the Roman era at Antinoë, Egypt
- Ryan Abadir (born 1992), an American retired competitive gamer
- Abadir Woreda, a district in Ethiopia

== See also ==
- Abadi (disambiguation)
- Badir, an Arabic given name and surname
- Agadir, a city in Morocco
