= Barbara Falkenbach Ryan =

American mathematician

Barbara Falkenbach Ryan is an American mathematician, computer scientist, statistician and business executive. She is known for developing the Minitab statistical software package, and for being president and CEO of Minitab, Inc.

== Education and early career ==
Ryan earned her Ph.D. in mathematics in 1968 at Cornell University, studying recursion theory under the supervision of Anil Nerode. Her dissertation was ω-Cohesive Sets. Nerode writes that, although Ryan moved away from this subject "immediately after her degree", Nerode still found her thesis work to be original and worth publishing many years later, and was able to persuade Ryan to publish the work in a journal by threatening to hold back a letter of reference for her.

Soon after completing their doctorates, Ryan and her then-husband, statistician and fellow Cornell graduate Thomas A. Ryan Jr. (1940–2017) found positions at Pennsylvania State University. She joined the computer science department at Penn State, and published research on a more applied topic, I/O scheduling.

== Minitab ==
In 1972, Thomas Ryan and another Penn State statistics instructor, Brian L. Joiner, first began developing Minitab, with the consultation of Barbara Ryan. In 1974, Joiner left Penn State and Barbara Ryan joined Thomas Ryan as one of the Minitab developers.

In 1983 the Ryans spun off their software into a company, Minitab, Inc. In 1988, Barbara Ryan and her husband divorced, her husband left Minitab, and Ryan became president and chief executive officer of the company.

As originally formulated, Minitab was primarily used for engineering applications and statistical education. In the late 1990s, Ryan chose to focus Minitab more towards Six Sigma business process improvement. The software became the market leader in this area, and this change spurred significant growth for the company.

== Service and recognition ==
Ryan chaired the Statistical Computing Section of the American Statistical Association in 1984. In 1990, the association named Ryan as a Fellow of the American Statistical Association.
