= CTX =

CTX is a three-letter abbreviation with multiple meanings:

== Medical ==
- C-terminal telopeptide, a blood serum biomarker that can be measured to assess bone turnover
- Ceftriaxone, an antibiotic
- Cefotaxime, an antibiotic
- Cerebrotendineous xanthomatosis, a genetic disorder
- Charybdotoxin, a toxin found in scorpion venom
- Chemotherapy, treatment of cancer with cytotoxic drugs
- Cholera toxin, a toxin responsible for the harmful effects of cholera
- Ciguatoxin, a neurotoxin produced by marine dinoflagellates
- Conotoxin, a toxin found in cone snail venom
- Crotoxin, toxic compound in snake venom
- Cyclophosphamide, an anticancer drug

== Technology ==
- Centrex, a telephone service
- Citrix Systems, company best known for desktop virtualization software
- Chuntex Electronic, computer display manufacturer based in Taiwan
- CTX (camera), on the Mars Reconnaissance Orbiter
- CTX (computer virus)
- CTX (explosive-detection device)
- Collisionless Terrella Experiment, a levitated dipole at Columbia University

== Business ==
- Caltex, where CTX is the stock symbol for Caltex Australia Limited
- Critical to X, key factors that are essential for the successful completion of a project or process.

== Others ==
- Archaeological context
- Concordia University Texas, where 'C' is for Concordia and 'TX' is for Texas
- Countdown to Extinction, a thrill ride at Disney's Animal Kingdom, now known as DINOSAUR
- CTX, IATA airport code for the city of Cortland, New York, U.S.A.
