= Thomas Pyzdek =

American author and management consultant

- Born: July 13, 1948 (age 78); Omaha, Nebraska, United States
- Education: University of Nebraska Omaha, University of Arizona
- Occupations: Author, management consultant
- Known for: Advocate of operational excellence in management

Thomas Pyzdek (born July 13, 1948) is an American author and management consultant. He is best known for being an advocate of operational excellence (quality control, process improvement, Lean, Six Sigma) and is an author of several books, hundreds of articles and papers on those topics.

== Early life and education ==
Pyzdek was born in Omaha, Nebraska, one of three children born to Charles and Margaret Pyzdek. Other than a brief period in the early 1950s, the family lived in Omaha during Pyzdek's entire childhood. Pyzdek's father and mother were blue-collar laborers, born to immigrants from Poland and Ireland, respectively. Pyzdek attended Holy Ghost Catholic elementary school and graduated from Ralston High School in Ralston, Nebraska in 1966.

Pyzdek received a BGS in Economics from the University of Nebraska at Omaha (1973), an M.S. in Systems and Industrial Engineering from the University of Arizona (1982), an MS in management from the University of Arizona and a PhD in management (ABD) from the University of Arizona (1995).

== Career ==
=== Continental Can Company ===
Thomas Pyzdek entered the quality profession in 1967 as a Quality Technician at Continental Can Company in Omaha, Nebraska. He next became a Quality Engineering Technician in 1971 at Lozier Corporation in Omaha, a leading manufacturer of store fixtures for supermarkets and retailers.

=== Valmont Industries ===
In 1975, Pyzdek worked for Valmont Industries, a manufacturer of central pivot irrigation systems, light poles and high-power transmission towers. At Valmont Pyzdek rose to the position of Supervisor, Quality and Reliability Engineering, supervising a group of Quality and Reliability Engineers.

=== Hughes Aircraft Company ===
In 1979, Pyzdek moved to the missile systems group of Hughes Aircraft Company in Tucson, Arizona. At Hughes, Pyzdek was Head of Total Quality Systems. He led a team of engineers and scientists focused on quality and process improvement. The mission of this group was to explore state-of-the-art quality and apply what they learned to processes at Hughes. Their responsibility was to teach management the most effective techniques and help in integrating these techniques into management systems at Hughes. Pyzdek's group operationalized their mission by analyzing Hughes's supplier database and benchmarking sources to identify those suppliers with premier quality performance records as determined by their customers.

=== Applied Concepts, Inc. ===
The experience with TQS helped Pyzdek establish connections with people who were using groundbreaking quality methods to achieve world-class results. He delved into self-employment in late 1983 by creating his own company, Applied Concepts, Inc. American firms, especially in the automotive industry, were under tremendous pressure from Japanese competitors. The documentary "If Japan Can, Why Can't We?" inspired Pyzdek. The documentary explained how Dr. W. Edwards Deming had taught post-WWII Japanese leaders how to use quality to help them make their organizations more competitive. Pyzdek, already familiar with Dr. Deming's work, contacted Ford and was added to the list of approved consultants. Pyzdek periodically visited Ford World Headquarters to attend meetings conducted by Ford Executives and Dr. Deming. As an approved consultant, Pyzdek provided consulting services and training to many Ford suppliers.

Pyzdek traveled with Dr. Deming to international leadership conferences and training sessions. Tom's role was to provide instruction on statistical process control (SPC) tools and techniques and "statistical thinking", while Dr. Deming taught management concepts.

Besides Ford suppliers, Pyzdek provided consulting and training for hundreds of clients of all sizes in virtually every major business segment.

=== Six Sigma ===
In 1988, Pyzdek attended a ceremony at The White House and was on the Board of Examiners where President Ronald Reagan presented the Malcolm Baldrige National Quality Award to Bob Galvin, CEO of Motorola. Bob and his team invented Six Sigma. The improvements to Motorola's systems from applying Six Sigma won them the award.

In 2004, Pyzdek helped found The International Journal of Six Sigma and Competitive Advantage. He is a member of the Editorial Advisory Board for the journal.

In 2008, Pyzdek founded The Pyzdek Institute. The institute was one of the first to provide online Six Sigma certification and training and was one of the first training organizations accredited by IASSC.

Through his extensive career, Pyzdek has provided Lean and Six Sigma consulting to major clients in a broad spectrum of industries. Pyzdek serves on numerous editorial boards and helped found such journals as The Quality Management Journal, Quality Engineering and the International Journal of Six Sigma and Competitive Advantage.

=== Other business ventures ===
Quality America (1986–1990). Statistical software, quality and process improvement consulting.

Quality Publishing (1986–1998). Publisher of books and training materials for quality professionals.

Pyzdek Consulting, Inc. (1983–2022). Quality and process improvement consulting.

== Awards ==
Pyzdek is a Fellow of the ASQ and recipient of the ASQ Edward's Medal l and the Simon Collier Quality Award, both for outstanding contributions to the field of quality management

Pyzdek was awarded the ASQ E.L. Grant Medal for outstanding contributions to Quality Education in 2007.

In 2010, Pyzdek received the Lean Six Sigma World Conference Leadership Award.

In 2016, Pyzdek received the first ASQ Six Sigma Forum Award for the Advancement of Six Sigma.

== Publications ==
=== Books ===
- The Lean Healthcare Handbook, Thomas Pyzdek, December 22, 2017.
- Six Sigma Handbook, Thomas Pyzdek and Paul Keller. McGraw-Hill Education; 5th edition (September 7, 2018).
- The Six Sigma Project Planner. McGraw-Hill, 2003.
- The End of Management, Self-published, 1999.
- The Complete Guide to the Certified Quality Technician Quality Publishing, Inc., (1995–1997)
- Pocket Guide to Quality Tools, 1995.
- Pyzdek's guide to SPC, Volume Two Applications and Special Topics, 1992.
- Co-editor of The quality engineering handbook, 1992.
- What every manager should know about quality, 1990.
- Pyzdek's guide to SPC, Volume One-Fundamentals, 1989.
- What every engineer should know about quality control, 1988.
- The CQE examination study guide, 1986.
- An SPC Primer, 1984.
- The ASQC CQE Examination Study Guide, 1988.
