= FPY =

FPY may refer to:

- Compagnie Africaine d'Aviation, an airline of the Democratic Republic of the Congo
- Play, a low-cost airline of Iceland
- First pass yield
- Perry–Foley Airport, in Florida, United States
- PFA Fans' Player of the Year
