= Design process (disambiguation) =

Design process can refer to:

- Any design process
- The design process used to design new products, buildings or systems
- The software engineering design process

== List of design processes ==
- The engineering design process
