= Rolled throughput yield =

Production economics term

Rolled throughput yield (RTY) in production economics is the probability that a process with more than one step will produce a defect free unit. It is the product of yields for each process step of the entire process.

For any process, it is ideal for that process to produce its product without defects and without rework. Rolled throughput yield quantifies the cumulative effects of inefficiencies found throughout the process. Rolled throughput yield and rolled throughput yield loss (RTYL) are often used in Six Sigma.

== See also ==
- Defects per million opportunities
- Business process
- Process capability
- Total quality management
- Total productive maintenance
