= CTQ =

CTQ may refer to:

- CTK – CiTylinK (ICAO: CTQ), in Accra, Ghana
- CTQ Tree (critical-to-quality tree), used in Six Sigma methodology
- Concordia Theological Quarterly
- 31 Digital in Brisbane, Australia, had the callsign CTQ-31 before the analogue shutdown then it had the callsign CTQ-32 until its closedown in 2017
