= First-pass yield =

Indicator of units from a process

First-pass yield (FPY), also known as throughput yield (TPY), is defined as the number of units coming out of a process divided by the number of units going into that process over a specified period of time.

== Example ==
Consider the following:

You have a process that is divided into four sub-processes: A, B, C and D. Assume that you have 100 units entering process A. To calculate first time yield (FTY) you would:

1. Calculate the yield (number out of step/number into step) of each step.
2. Multiply these together.

For example:

(# units leaving the process as good parts) / (# units put into the process) = FTY

- 100 units enter A and 90 leave as good parts. The FTY for process A is 90/100 = 0.9000
- 90 units go into B and 80 leave as good parts. The FTY for process B is 80/90 = 0.8889
- 80 units go into C and 75 leave as good parts. The FTY for C is 75/80 = 0.9375
- 75 units go into D and 70 leave as good parts. The FTY for D is 70/75 = 0.9333

The total first time yield is equal to FTYofA * FTYofB * FTYofC * FTYofD or 0.9000 * 0.8889 * 0.9375 * 0.9333 = 0.7000.

You can also get the total process yield for the entire process by simply dividing the number of good units produced by the number going into the start of the process. In this case, 70/100 = 0.70 or 70% yield.

The same example using first pass yield (FPY) would take into account rework:

(# units leaving process A as good parts with no rework) / (# units put into the process)

- 100 units enter process A, 5 were reworked, and 90 leave as good parts. The FPY for process A is (90-5)/100 = 85/100 = 0.8500
- 90 units go into process B, 0 are reworked, and 80 leave as good parts. The FPY for process B is (80-0)/90 = 80/90 = 0.8889
- 80 units go into process C, 10 are reworked, and 75 leave as good parts. The FPY for process C is (75-10)/80 = 65/80 = 0.8125
- 75 units go into process D, 8 are reworked, and 70 leave as good parts. The FPY for process D is (70-8)/75 = 62/75 = 0.8267

First pass yield is only used for an individual sub-process. Multiplying the set of processes would give you Rolling throughput yield (RTY). RTY is equal to FPYofA * FPYofB * FPYofC * FPYofD = 0.8500 * 0.8889 * 0.8125 * 0.8267 = 0.5075

Notice that the number of units going into each next process does not change from the original example, as that number of good units did, indeed, enter the next process. Yet the number of FPY units of each process counts only those that made it through the process as good parts that needed no rework to be good parts. The calculation of RTY, rolling throughput yield, shows how good the overall set of processes is at producing good overall output without having to rework units.

== See also ==
- Rolled throughput yield
- Six Sigma
- Statistical quality control
- Quality management
