= PICK chart =

A PICK chart is a Lean Six Sigma tool, for organizing process improvement ideas and categorizing them during the Identify and Prioritize Opportunities Phase of a Lean Six Sigma project.

== Background ==
The PICK chart was initially developed by Lockheed Martin for identification and prioritization of the company’s process improvement applications.

== Use ==
PICK charts are a method to prioritize a number of action items or problem solving ideas. A pick chart allows visual comparison of action items relative to their impact to the problem being addressed vs. the ease/cost of implementation. In very rudimentary terms, PICK charts are a Return on Investment (ROI) method.

When faced with multiple improvement ideas a PICK chart may be used to determine the most useful. There are four categories on a 2*2 matrix; horizontal is scale of payoff (or benefits), vertical is ease of implementation. By deciding where an idea falls on the pick chart four proposed project actions are provided; Possible, Implement, Challenge and Kill (thus the name PICK).

	Low payoff	High payoff
Easy to do	Possible	Implement
Hard to do	Kill	Challenge

The vertical axis, representing ease of implementation would typically include some assessment of cost to implement as well. More expensive actions can be said to be more difficult to implement.

== See also ==
- Cost–benefit analysis
