= Badir =

Badir (Arabic: بدير) is an Arabic given name and surname. Notable people with the name include:

== Given name ==
- Badir Shoukri (born 1926), Egyptian sports shooter

== Surname ==
- Walid Badir (born 1974), Israeli football player
- Youhannes Ezzat Zakaria Badir (1949–2015), Egyptian bishop

== Others ==
- BADIR, data science and data analytics process
