= Defects per million opportunities =

Measure of process performance

In process improvement efforts, defects per million opportunities or DPMO (or nonconformities per million opportunities (NPMO)) is a measure of process performance. It is defined as

$$\text{DPMO} = \frac{1,000,000 \times \mbox{number of defects}}{\mbox{number of units} \times \mbox{number of defects opportunities per unit} }$$

A defect can be defined as a nonconformance of a quality characteristic (e.g. strength, width, response time) to its specification. DPMO is stated in opportunities per million units for convenience: processes that are considered highly capable (e.g., processes of Six Sigma quality) are those that experience fewer than 3.4 defects per million opportunities (or services provided).

Note that DPMO differs from reporting defective parts per million (PPM) in that it comprehends the possibility that a unit under inspection may be found to have multiple defects of the same type or may have multiple types of defects. Identifying specific opportunities for defects (and therefore how to count and categorize defects) is an art, but generally organizations consider the following when defining the number of opportunities per unit:

- Knowledge of the process under study
- Industry standards
- When studying multiple types of defects, knowledge of the relative importance of each defect type in determining customer satisfaction
- The time, effort, and cost to count and categorize defects in process output

== Other measures ==
Other measures of process performance include:

- Process capability indices such as C_{pk}
- Natural tolerance limit or sigma level
- PPM defective or defective parts per million
- Process performance indices such as P_{pk}
- Quality costs or cost of poor quality (COPQ)
