= Distribution-free control chart =

Statistical process monitoring tool

Distribution-free (nonparametric) control charts are one of the most important tools of statistical process monitoring and control. Implementation techniques of distribution-free control charts do not require any knowledge about the underlying process distribution or its parameters. The main advantage of distribution-free control charts is its in-control robustness, in the sense that, irrespective of the nature of the underlying process distributions, the properties of these control charts remain the same when the process is smoothly operating without presence of any assignable cause.

Early research on nonparametric control charts may be found in 1981 when P.K. Bhattacharya and D. Frierson introduced a nonparametric control chart for detecting small disorders. However, major growth of nonparametric control charting schemes has taken place only in the recent years.

== Popular distribution-free control charts ==
There are distribution-free control charts for both Phase-I analysis and Phase-II monitoring.

One of the most notable distribution-free control charts for Phase-I analysis is RS/P chart proposed by G. Capizzi and G. Masarotto. RS/P charts separately monitor location and scale parameters of a univariate process using two separate charts. In 2019, Chenglong Li, Amitava Mukherjee and Qin Su proposed a single distribution-free control chart for Phase-I analysis using multisample Lepage statistic.

Some popular Phase-II distribution-free control charts for univariate continuous processes includes:

- Sign charts based on the sign statistic - used to monitor location parameter of a process
- Wilcoxon rank-sum charts based on the Wilcoxon rank-sum test - used to monitor location parameter of a process
- Control charts based on precedence or excedance statistic
- Shewhart-Lepage chart based on the Lepage test - used to monitor both location and scale parameters of a process simultaneously in a single chart
- Shewhart-Cucconi chart based on the Cucconi test - used to monitor both location and scale parameters of a process simultaneously in a single chart
