= Process capability =

Workability and cooperation in producing a measurable output

The process capability is a measurable property of a process to the specification, expressed as a process capability index (e.g., C_{pk} or C_{pm}) or as a process performance index (e.g., P_{pk} or P_{pm}). The output of this measurement is often illustrated by a histogram and calculations that predict how many parts will be produced out of specification (OOS).

Two parts of process capability are:

1. Measure the variability of the output of a process, and
2. Compare that variability with a proposed specification or product tolerance

== Capabilities ==
The input of a process usually has at least one or more measurable characteristics that are used to specify outputs. These can be analyzed statistically; where the output data shows a normal distribution the process can be described by the process mean (average) and the standard deviation.

A process needs to be established with appropriate process controls in place. A control chart analysis is used to determine whether the process is "in statistical control" If the process is not in statistical control then capability has no meaning. Therefore, the process capability involves only common cause variation and not special cause variation.

A batch of data needs to be obtained from the measured output of the process. The more data that is included the more precise the result, however an estimate can be achieved with as few as 17 data points. This should include the normal variety of production conditions, materials, and people in the process. With a manufactured product, it is common to include at least three different production runs, including start-ups.

The process mean (average) and standard deviation are calculated. With a normal distribution, the "tails" can extend well beyond plus and minus three standard deviations, but this interval should contain about 99.73% of production output. Therefore, for a normal distribution of data the process capability is often described as the relationship between six standard deviations and the required specification.

== Capability study ==
The output of a process is expected to meet customer requirements, specifications, or engineering tolerances. Engineers can conduct a process capability study to determine the extent to which the process can meet these expectations.

The ability of a process to meet specifications can be expressed as a single number using a process capability index or it can be assessed using control charts. Either case requires running the process to obtain enough measurable output so that engineering is confident that the process is stable and so that the process mean and variability can be reliably estimated. Statistical process control defines techniques to properly differentiate between stable processes, processes that are drifting (experiencing a long-term change in the mean of the output), and processes that are growing more variable. Process capability indices are only meaningful for processes that are stable (in a state of statistical control).

== See also ==
- Process (engineering)
- Control chart
- Corrective and preventative action (CAPA)
- Kurtosis
- Normal distribution
- Six Sigma
- Statistical interference
- Statistical process control
- Tolerance (engineering)
