= CTQ tree =

Critical-to-quality characteristics

CTQ trees (critical-to-quality trees) are the key measurable characteristics of a product or process whose performance standards or specification limits must be met in order to satisfy the customer. They align improvement or design efforts with customer requirements.

CTQs are used to decompose broad customer requirements into more easily quantified elements. CTQ trees are often used as part of Six Sigma methodology to help prioritize such requirements.

CTQs represent the product or service characteristics as defined by the customer/user. Customers may be surveyed to elicit quality, service and performance data. They may include upper and lower specification limits or any other factors. A CTQ must be an actionable, quantitative business specification.

CTQs reflect the expressed needs of the customer. The CTQ practitioner converts them to measurable terms using tools such as DFMEA. Services and products are typically not monolithic. They must be decomposed into constituent elements (tasks in the case of services).

== See also ==
- Business process
- Design for Six Sigma
- Total quality management
- Total productive maintenance
