= Random stimulus =

A random stimulus is any class of creativity techniques that explores randomization. Most of their names start with the word "random", such as random word, random heuristic, random picture and random sound. In each random creativity technique, the user is presented with a random stimulus and explores associations that could trigger novel ideas. The power of random stimulus is that it can lead you to explore useful associations that would not emerge intentionally.

== Random word technique ==
Random word is the simplest technique of this class. A randomly picked word is used to generate new associations. The intent is to reveal a different angle of attack on the problem.

=== Implementations ===
Low-tech implementations of random word often randomly shuffle a pile of index cards. For example, the "Oblique Strategies" created by Brian Eno and Peter Schmidt in 1975 is a set of 100 cards, each of which is a suggestion of a course of action or thinking to assist in creative situations, where standard logical solutions do not produce the desired result. High-tech implementations adopt computers, random number generators and internet resources.

Simple random techniques are classified by modality of association (Verbal, Visual, Audial, Kinesthetic). Multi-modal techniques combine different random elements from multiple domains. A 'random article' link is an example of this kind of technique implemented by MediaWiki. Before its closure in 2018, StumbleUpon was such a tool.

== Evolutionary-computation model ==
The evolutionary-computation model of creativity views random stimulus creativity techniques as mutation operators. Each such operator has some potential to bring a relatively small and beneficial change (innovation). Success of this process can be measured by the innovation rate. The innovation rate depends on the distribution from which the random stimuli are sampled. Improving innovation rate is an important research problem in human-based evolutionary computation.

== See also ==
- Creativity techniques
- Lateral thinking
- Brainstorming
- Oblique Strategies
- Evolutionary computation
- Human-based evolutionary computation
