= Problem statement =

Description of an issue

A problem statement is a description of an issue to be addressed, or a condition to be improved upon. It identifies the gap between the current problem and goal. The first condition of solving a problem is understanding the problem, which can be done by way of a problem statement.

Problem statements are used by most businesses and organizations to execute process improvement projects.

== Purpose ==
The main purpose of a problem statement is to identify and explain the problem.

Another function of the problem statement is as a communication device. Before the project begins, stakeholders verify the problem and goals are accurately described in the problem statement. Once approved, the project reviews it. This also helps define project scope.

The problem statement is referenced throughout the project to establish focus within the project team and verify they stay on track. At the end of the project, it is revisited to confirm the solution indeed solves the problem.

The problem statement does not define the solution or methods of reaching the solution, and only recognizes the gap between the problem and goal.

== Writing ==
There are several basic elements that can be built into every problem statement. The problem statement should focus on the end user, and the statement should not be too broad or narrow.

Problem statements usually follow a format. While there are several options, the following is a template often used in business analysis.

1. Ideal: The desired state of the process or product.
2. Reality: The current state of the process or product.
3. Consequences: The impacts on the business if the problem is not fixed or improved upon.
4. Proposal: Potential solutions.
