= Design for Six Sigma =

Business management method

Design for Six Sigma (DFSS) is a collection of best-practices for the development of new products and processes. It is sometimes deployed as an engineering design process or business process management method. DFSS originated at General Electric to build on the success they had with traditional Six Sigma; but instead of process improvement, DFSS was made to target new product development. It is used in many industries, like finance, marketing, basic engineering, process industries, waste management, and electronics. It is based on the use of statistical tools like linear regression and enables empirical research similar to that performed in other fields, such as social science. While the tools and order used in Six Sigma require a process to be in place and functioning, DFSS has the objective of determining the needs of customers and the business, and driving those needs into the product solution so created. It is used for product or process design in contrast with process improvement. Measurement is the most important part of most Six Sigma or DFSS tools, but whereas in Six Sigma measurements are made from an existing process, DFSS focuses on gaining deep insight into customer needs and using these to inform every design decision and trade-off.

There are different options for the implementation of DFSS. Unlike Six Sigma, which is commonly driven via DMAIC (Define - Measure - Analyze - Improve - Control) projects, DFSS has spawned a number of stepwise processes, all in the style of the DMAIC procedure.

DMADV, define – measure – analyze – design – verify, is sometimes synonymously referred to as DFSS, although alternatives such as IDOV (Identify, Design, Optimize, Verify) are also used. The traditional DMAIC Six Sigma process, as it is usually practiced, which is focused on evolutionary and continuous improvement manufacturing or service process development, usually occurs after initial system or product design and development have been largely completed. DMAIC Six Sigma as practiced is usually consumed with solving existing manufacturing or service process problems and removal of the defects and variation associated with defects. It is clear that manufacturing variations may impact product reliability. So, a clear link should exist between reliability engineering and Six Sigma (quality). In contrast, DFSS (or DMADV and IDOV) strives to generate a new process where none existed, or where an existing process is deemed to be inadequate and in need of replacement. DFSS aims to create a process with the end in mind of optimally building the efficiencies of Six Sigma methodology into the process before implementation; traditional Six Sigma seeks for continuous improvement after a process already exists.

== DFSS as an approach to design ==
DFSS seeks to avoid manufacturing/service process problems by using advanced techniques to avoid process problems at the outset (e.g., fire prevention). When combined, these methods obtain the proper needs of the customer, and derive engineering system parameter requirements that increase product and service effectiveness in the eyes of the customer and all other people. This yields products and services that provide great customer satisfaction and increased market share. These techniques also include tools and processes to predict, model and simulate the product delivery system (the processes/tools, personnel and organization, training, facilities, and logistics to produce the product/service). In this way, DFSS is closely related to operations research (solving the knapsack problem), workflow balancing. DFSS is largely a design activity requiring tools including: quality function deployment (QFD), axiomatic design, TRIZ, Design for X, design of experiments (DOE), Taguchi methods, tolerance design, robustification and Response Surface Methodology for a single or multiple response optimization. While these tools are sometimes used in the classic DMAIC Six Sigma process, they are uniquely used by DFSS to analyze new and unprecedented products and processes. It is a concurrent analyzes directed to manufacturing optimization related to the design.

=== Critics ===
Response surface methodology and other DFSS tools uses statistical (often empirical) models, and therefore practitioners need to be aware that even the best statistical model is an approximation to reality. In practice, both the models and the parameter values are unknown, and subject to uncertainty on top of ignorance. Of course, an estimated optimum point need not be optimum in reality, because of the errors of the estimates and of the inadequacies of the model. The uncertainties can be handled via a Bayesian predictive approach, which considers the uncertainties in the model parameters as part of the optimization. The optimization is not based on a fitted model for the mean response, E[Y], but rather, the posterior probability that the responses satisfies given specifications is maximized according to the available experimental data.

Nonetheless, response surface methodology has an effective track-record of helping researchers improve products and services: For example, George Box's original response-surface modeling enabled chemical engineers to improve a process that had been stuck at a saddle-point for years.

== Distinctions from DMAIC ==
Proponents of DMAIC, DDICA (Design Develop Initialize Control and Allocate) and Lean techniques might claim that DFSS falls under the general rubric of Six Sigma or Lean Six Sigma (LSS). Both methodologies focus on meeting customer needs and business priorities as the starting-point for analysis.

It is often seen that the tools used for DFSS techniques vary widely from those used for DMAIC Six Sigma. In particular, DMAIC, DDICA practitioners often use new or existing mechanical drawings and manufacturing process instructions as the originating information to perform their analysis, while DFSS practitioners often use simulations and parametric system design/analysis tools to predict both cost and performance of candidate system architectures. While it can be claimed that two processes are similar, in practice the working medium differs enough so that DFSS requires different tool sets in order to perform its design tasks. DMAIC, IDOV and Six Sigma may still be used during depth-first plunges into the system architecture analysis and for "back end" Six Sigma processes; DFSS provides system design processes used in front-end complex system designs. Back-front systems also are used. This makes 3.4 defects per million design opportunities if done well.

Traditional six sigma methodology, DMAIC, has become a standard process optimization tool for the chemical process industries. However, it has become clear that the promise of six sigma, specifically, 3.4 defects per million opportunities (DPMO), is simply unachievable after the fact. Consequently, there has been a growing movement to implement six sigma design usually called design for six sigma DFSS and DDICA tools. This methodology begins with defining customer needs and leads to the development of robust processes to deliver those needs.

Design for Six Sigma emerged from the Six Sigma and the Define-Measure-Analyze-Improve-Control (DMAIC) quality methodologies, which were originally developed by Motorola to systematically improve processes by eliminating defects. Unlike its traditional Six Sigma/DMAIC predecessors, which are usually focused on solving existing manufacturing issues (i.e., "fire fighting"), DFSS aims at avoiding manufacturing problems by taking a more proactive approach to problem solving and engaging the company efforts at an early stage to reduce problems that could occur (i.e., "fire prevention"). The primary goal of DFSS is to achieve a significant reduction in the number of nonconforming units and production variation. It starts from an understanding of the customer expectations, needs and Critical to Quality issues (CTQs) before a design can be completed. Typically in a DFSS program, only a small portion of the CTQs are reliability-related (CTR), and therefore, reliability does not get center stage attention in DFSS. DFSS rarely looks at the long-term (after manufacturing) issues that might arise in the product (e.g. complex fatigue issues or electrical wear-out, chemical issues, cascade effects of failures, system level interactions).

== Similarities with other methods ==
Arguments about what makes DFSS different from Six Sigma demonstrate the similarities between DFSS and other established engineering practices such as probabilistic design and design for quality. In general Six Sigma with its DMAIC roadmap focuses on improvement of an existing process or processes. DFSS focuses on the creation of new value with inputs from customers, suppliers and business needs. While traditional Six Sigma may also use those inputs, the focus is again on improvement and not design of some new product or system. It also shows the engineering background of DFSS. However, like other methods developed in engineering, there is no theoretical reason why DFSS cannot be used in areas outside of engineering.

== Software engineering applications ==
Historically, although the first successful Design for Six Sigma projects in 1989 and 1991 predate establishment of the DMAIC process improvement process, Design for Six Sigma (DFSS) is accepted in part because Six Sigma organisations found that they could not optimise products past three or four Sigma without fundamentally redesigning the product, and because improving a process or product after launch is considered less efficient and effective than designing in quality. ‘Six Sigma’ levels of performance have to be ‘built-in’.

DFSS for software is essentially a non superficial modification of "classical DFSS" since the character and nature of software is different from other fields of engineering. The methodology describes the detailed process for successfully applying DFSS methods and tools throughout the software product design, covering the overall Software Development life cycle: requirements, architecture, design, implementation, integration, optimization, verification and validation (RADIOV). The methodology explains how to build predictive statistical models for software reliability and robustness and shows how simulation and analysis techniques can be combined with structural design and architecture methods to effectively produce software and information systems at Six Sigma levels.

DFSS in software acts as a glue to blend the classical modelling techniques of software engineering such as object-oriented design or Evolutionary Rapid Development with statistical, predictive models and simulation techniques. The methodology provides Software Engineers with practical tools for measuring and predicting the quality attributes of the software product and also enables them to include software in system reliability models.

== Data mining and predictive analytics application ==
Although many tools used in DFSS consulting such as response surface methodology, transfer function via linear and non linear modeling, axiomatic design, simulation have their origin in inferential statistics, statistical modeling may overlap with data analytics and mining,

However, despite that DFSS as a methodology has been successfully used as an end-to-end [technical project frameworks ] for analytic and mining projects, this has been observed by domain experts to be somewhat similar to the lines of CRISP-DM

DFSS is claimed to be better suited for encapsulating and effectively handling higher number of uncertainties including missing and uncertain data, both in terms of acuteness of definition and their absolute total numbers with respect to analytic s and data-mining tasks, six sigma approaches to data-mining are popularly known as DFSS over CRISP [ CRISP- DM referring to data-mining application framework methodology of SPSS ]

With DFSS data mining projects have been observed to have considerably shortened development life cycle . This is typically achieved by conducting data analysis to pre-designed template match tests via a techno-functional approach using multilevel quality function deployment on the data-set.

Practitioners claim that progressively complex KDD templates are created by multiple DOE runs on simulated complex multivariate data, then the templates along with logs are extensively documented via a decision tree based algorithm

DFSS uses Quality Function Deployment and SIPOC for feature engineering of known independent variables, thereby aiding in techno-functional computation of derived attributes

Once the predictive model has been computed, DFSS studies can also be used to provide stronger probabilistic estimations of predictive model rank in a real world scenario

DFSS framework has been successfully applied for predictive analytics pertaining to the HR analytics field, This application field has been considered to be traditionally very challenging due to the peculiar complexities of predicting human behavior.
