= Critical to quality =

Attribute of a part, product or process

Critical to quality is an attribute of a part, assembly, sub-assembly, product, or process that is literally critical to quality or more precisely, has a direct and significant impact on its actual or perceived quality.

== See also ==
- Business process
- CTQ tree
- Design for Six Sigma
- Total quality management
- Total productive maintenance
