= Lean Six Sigma =

Methodology of systematically removing waste

Lean Six Sigma is a process improvement method that uses a collaborative team effort to improve performance by systematically removing operational waste and reducing process variation. It combines the many tools and techniques that form the "tool box" of Lean Management and Six Sigma to increase the velocity of value creation in business processes.

== History ==
=== 1980s–2000s ===
Lean Six Sigma's predecessor, Six Sigma, originated from the Motorola company in the United States in 1986. Six Sigma was developed within Motorola to compete with the kaizen (or lean manufacturing) business model in Japan.

In the 1990s, Allied Signal hired Larry Bossidy and introduced Six Sigma in heavy manufacturing. A few years later, General Electric's Jack Welch consulted Bossidy and implemented Six Sigma at the conglomerate.

During the 2000s, Lean Six Sigma forked from Six Sigma and became its own unique process. While Lean Six Sigma developed as a specific process of Six Sigma, it also incorporates ideas from lean manufacturing, which was developed as a part of the Toyota Production System in the 1950s.

=== 2000s–2010s ===
The first concept of Lean Six Sigma was created in Chuck Mills, Barbara Wheat, and Mike Carnell's 2001 book, Leaning into Six Sigma: The Path to Integration of Lean Enterprise and Six Sigma. It was developed as a guide for managers of manufacturing plants on how to combine lean manufacturing and Six Sigma to improve quality and cycle time in the plant.

In the early 2000s Six Sigma principles expanded into other sectors of the economy, such as healthcare, finance, and supply chains.

== Description ==
Lean Six Sigma is a synergized managerial concept of Lean and Six Sigma. Lean traditionally focuses on eliminating the eight kinds of waste ("muda"), and Six Sigma focuses on improving process output quality by identifying and removing the causes of defects (errors) and minimizing variability in (manufacturing and business) processes.

Lean Six Sigma is based on the premise that, in order to deliver service and product excellence, firms must not only have an in-depth knowledge of their internal processes but also a profound understanding of customers' current expectations and future needs.

Lean Six Sigma uses the Define, Measure, Analyze, Improve, and Control (DMAIC) phases, similar to those of Six Sigma. The five phases used in Lean Six Sigma aim to identify the root causes of inefficiencies and can be applied to any process, product, or service that has a large amount of data or measurable characteristics available.

The different levels of certification are divided into belt colors. The highest level of certification is the Black Belt, signifying a deep knowledge of Lean Six Sigma principles. Below the Black Belt are the Green Belt and Yellow Belt. For each of these belts, specific skill sets are defined that describe which of the overall Lean Six Sigma tools are expected to be part of each belt level. The skill sets reflect elements from Six Sigma, Lean and other process improvement methods like the theory of constraints and total productive maintenance. In order to achieve any of the certification levels, a proctored exam must be passed that asks questions about Lean Six Sigma and its applications.

Lean Six Sigma organization structure

== Waste ==
Waste (muda) is defined by Fujio Cho as "anything other than the minimum amount of equipment, materials, parts, space, and workers time, which are absolutely essential to add value to the product".

Different types of waste have been defined in the form of a mnemonic of "downtime":

- Defects: A defect is a product that is declared unfit for use, which requires the product to be either scrapped or reworked, costing the company time and money. Examples include a product that is scratched during the production process and incorrect assembly of a product due to unclear instructions.
- Over-production: Over-production refers to products made in excess or before it is needed. Examples include creating unnecessary reports and overproduction of a product before a customer has requested it.
- Waiting: Waiting involves delays in process steps and is split into two different categories: waiting for material and equipment and idle equipment. Examples include waiting for authorization from a superior, waiting for an email response, waiting for material delivery, and slow or faulty equipment.
- Non-Used Talent: Non-Used Talent refers to the waste of human potential and skill. The main cause is when management is segregated from employees; when this occurs, employees are not given the opportunity to provide feedback and recommendations to managers in order to improve the process flow and production suffers. Examples include poorly trained employees, lack of incentives for employees, and placing employees in jobs or positions that do not use all of their knowledge or skill.
- Transportation: Transportation is the unnecessary or excessive movement of materials, products, people, equipment, and tools. Transportation adds no value to the product and can lead to product damage and defects. Examples include moving products between different functional areas and sending overstocked inventory back to an outlet warehouse.
- Inventory: Inventory refers to an excess in products and materials that are unprocessed. It is a problem because the product may become obsolete before the customer requires it, storing the inventory costs the company time and money, and the possibility of damage and defects increases over time. Examples include excess finished goods, finished goods that cannot be sold, and broken machines on the manufacturing floor.
- Motion: Motion is unnecessary movement by people. Excessive motion wastes time and increases the chance of injury. Examples include walking to get tools, reaching for materials, and walking to different parts of the manufacturing floor to complete different tasks.
- Extra-processing: Extra-processing is doing more work than required or necessary to complete a task. Examples include double-entering data, unnecessary steps in production, unnecessary product customization, and using higher precision equipment than necessary.

== See also ==
- Business process
- Design for Six Sigma
- DMAIC
- Industrial Engineering
- Lean IT
- Lean manufacturing
- Six Sigma
- Total productive maintenance
- Total quality management
