= Run chart =

Graph that displays observed data in a time sequencer

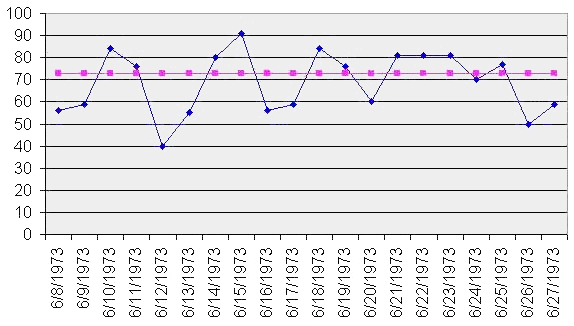
A simple run chart showing data collected over time. The median of the observed data (73) is also shown on the chart.

A run chart, also known as a run-sequence plot, is a graph that displays observed data in a time sequence. Often, the data displayed represent some aspect of the output or performance of a manufacturing or other business process. It is therefore a form of line chart.

== Overview ==
Run sequence plots are an easy way to graphically summarize a univariate data set. A common assumption of univariate data sets is that they behave like:

- random drawings;
- from a fixed distribution;
- with a common location; and
- with a common scale.

With run sequence plots, shifts in location and scale are typically quite evident. Also, outliers can easily be detected.

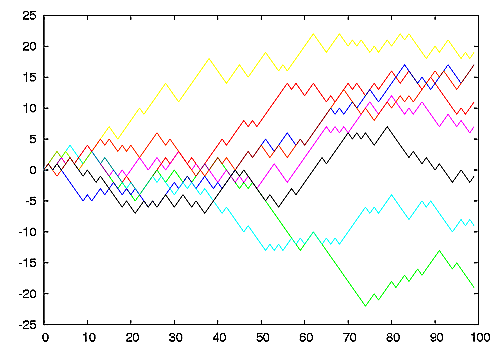
Run chart of eight random walks in one dimension starting at 0. The plot shows the current position on the line (vertical axis) versus the time steps (horizontal axis).

Examples could include measurements of the fill level of bottles filled at a bottling plant or the water temperature of a dishwashing machine each time it is run. Time is generally represented on the horizontal (x) axis and the property under observation on the vertical (y) axis. Often, some measure of central tendency (mean or median) of the data is indicated by a horizontal reference line.

Run charts are analyzed to find anomalies in data that suggest shifts in a process over time or special factors that may be influencing the variability of a process. Typical factors considered include unusually long "runs" of data points above or below the average line, the total number of such runs in the data set, and unusually long series of consecutive increases or decreases.

Run charts are similar in some regards to the control charts used in statistical process control, but do not show the control limits of the process. They are therefore simpler to produce, but do not allow for the full range of analytic techniques supported by control charts.
