= BADIR =

Data analytics process

The BADIR (pronounced /ˈbaːdɪr/) is a structured data science and data analytics process designed to enhance data-driven decision-making within organizations by addressing both analytical output as well as usefulness to management. It was developed by Piyanka Jain and Puneet Sharma and first published in the 2014 book “Behind Every Good Decision”.

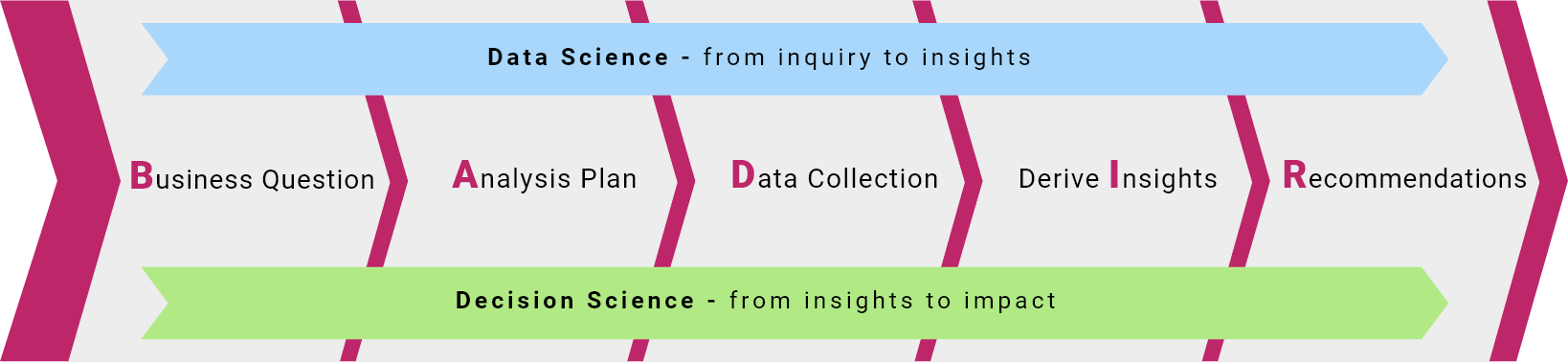
BADIR data flow

== Overview ==
The BADIR Framework employs a hypothesis-driven approach that involves understanding business objectives and challenges, analysis planning before acquiring and ensuring the quality of relevant data, applying analytics to derive insights and the potential impact on the business challenge, developing actionable recommendations aligned with strategic goals, and implementing decisions while monitoring outcomes and making necessary adjustments.

== Key Components of BADIR ==
The BADIR Framework consists of interrelated components essential for decision-making. Its main assertion is that if data analytics does not drive business impact, then it is just statistics, not analytics. The acronym in the framework stands for the following five steps:

1. B = Business Question: The first step in the framework is to define the real business question. Market trends, customer feedback, competitor actions, etc. are data sources commonly used by businesses. However, these data alone do not help teams to make decisions.
2. A = Analysis Plan: Once the fundamental business question is defined, the next phase involves generating and testing hypotheses to explore potential strategic directions. This phase ensures that decisions are not based on assumptions but on validated data insights.
3. D = Data Collection: With a clear plan and methodology in place, the next step is to gather the required data. This stage is crucial as the quality of data directly affects the reliability of insights derived from it.
4. I = Insights Derivation: This phase involves analyzing the data to identify patterns, trends, and outcomes that either support or challenge the proposed hypotheses.
5. R = Recommendations: The final step is to synthesize the insights gained through data analysis into actionable recommendations that can guide strategic business decisions.

== Origin ==
Piyanka Jain, a data science expert with experience at Adobe and PayPal, developed the BADIR framework to address the need for more structured data analytics methodologies. Observing that data-driven decision-making was often seen as complex and inaccessible, Jain designed BADIR as a five-step process to streamline and simplify data analysis in business environments.

== Impact and Recognition ==
According to Jain, the framework's focus on defining the business question early is said to optimize up to 80% of a business leader's workflow by reducing guesswork and concentrating efforts on strategic goals. IMA's Strategic Finance magazine compared the framework to the scientific process in terms of its approach to data analysis, and noted its ability to improve cross-departmental efficiency. The framework has been recommended for a variety of business leaders, from customer service managers to records and information management professionals.
