= Process (engineering) =

Series of interrelated tasks that transform inputs into outputs

In engineering, a process is a series of interrelated tasks that, together, transform inputs into a given output. These tasks may be carried out by people, nature or machines using various resources; an engineering process must be considered in the context of the agents carrying out the tasks and the resource attributes involved. Systems engineering normative documents and those related to Maturity Models are typically based on processes, for example, systems engineering processes of the EIA-632 and processes involved in the Capability Maturity Model Integration (CMMI) institutionalization and improvement approach. Constraints imposed on the tasks and resources required to implement them are essential for executing the tasks mentioned.

== Semiconductor industry ==
Semiconductor process engineers face the unique challenge of transforming raw materials into high-tech devices. Common semiconductor devices include Integrated Circuits (ICs), Light-Emitting Diodes (LEDs), solar cells, and solid-state lasers. To produce these and other semiconductor devices, semiconductor process engineers rely heavily on interconnected physical and chemical processes.

A prominent example of these combined processes is the use of ultra-violet photolithography which is then followed by wet etching, the process of creating an IC pattern that is transferred onto an organic coating and etched onto the underlying semiconductor chip. Other examples include the ion implantation of dopant species to tailor the electrical properties of a semiconductor chip and the electrochemical deposition of metallic interconnects (e.g. electroplating). Process Engineers are generally involved in the development, scaling, and quality control of new semiconductor processes from lab bench to manufacturing floor.

== Chemical engineering ==
A chemical process is a series of unit operations used to produce a material in large quantities.

In the chemical industry, chemical engineers will use the following to define or illustrate a process:

- Process flow diagram (PFD)
- Piping and instrumentation diagram (P&ID)
- Simplified process description
- Detailed process description
- Project management
- Process simulation

== CPRET ==
The Association Française d'Ingénierie Système has developed a process definition dedicated to Systems engineering (SE), but open to all domains. The CPRET representation integrates the process Mission and Environment in order to offer an external standpoint. Several models may correspond to a single definition depending on the language used (UML or another language). Note: process definition and modeling are interdependent notions but different the one from the other.

- Process
  - A process is a set of transformations of input elements into products: respecting constraints,
  - requiring resources,
  - meeting a defined mission, corresponding to a specific purpose adapted to a given environment.
- Environment
  - Natural conditions and external factors impacting a process.
- Mission
  - Purpose of the process tailored to a given environment.

This definition requires a process description to include the Constraints, Products, Resources, Input Elements and Transformations. This leads to the CPRET acronym to be used as name and mnemonic for this definition.

- Constraints
  - Imposed conditions, rules or regulations.
- Products
  - All whatever is generated by transformations. The products can be of the desired or not desired type (e.g., the software system and bugs, the defined products and waste).
- Resources
  - Human resources, energy, time and other means required to carry out the transformations.
- Elements as inputs
  - Elements submitted to transformations for producing the products.
- Transformations
  - Operations organized according to a logic aimed at optimizing the attainment of specific products from the input elements, with the allocated resources and on compliance with the imposed constraints.

=== CPRET through examples ===
The purpose of the following examples is to illustrate the definitions with concrete cases. These examples come from the Engineering field but also from other fields to show that the CPRET definition of processes is not limited to the System Engineering context.

Examples of processes

- An engineering (EIA-632, ISO/IEC 15288, etc.)
- A concert
- A polling campaign
- A certification

Examples of environment

- Various levels of maturity, technicality, equipment
- An audience
- A political system
- Practices

Examples of mission

- Supply better quality products
- Satisfy the public, critics
- Have candidates elected
- Obtain the desired approval

Examples of constraints

- Imposed technologies
- Correct acoustics
- Speaking times
- A reference model (ISO, CMMI, etc.)

Examples of products

- A mobile telephone network
- A show
- Vote results
- A quality label

Examples of resources

- Development teams
- An orchestra and its instruments
- An organization
- An assessment team

Examples of elements as inputs

- Specifications
- Scores
- Candidates
- A company and its practices

Examples of transformations

- Define an architecture
- Play the scores
- Make people vote for a candidate
- Audit the organization

== Conclusions ==
The CPRET formalized definition systematically addresses the input Elements, Transformations, and Products but also the other essential components of a Process, namely the Constraints and Resources. Among the resources, note the specificity of the Resource-Time component which passes inexorably and irreversibly, with problems of synchronization and sequencing.

This definition states that environment is an external factor which cannot be avoided: as a matter of fact, a process is always interdependent with other phenomena including other processes.

== Bibliography ==
Gilb, Tom (2005). Competitive Engineering. Burlington MA: Elsevier Butterworth-Heinemann. ISBN 0-7506-6507-6.
