= Lean =

Lean, leaning or LEAN may refer to:

== Business practices ==
- Lean thinking, a business methodology adopted in various fields
- Lean construction, an adaptation of lean manufacturing principles to the design and construction process
- Lean government, application of lean thinking to government
- Lean higher education, application of lean manufacturing principles in Higher Education
- Lean integration, application of lean manufacturing principles to data and systems integration
- Lean IT, application of lean manufacturing principles to the development and management of information technology (IT) products and services
- Lean laboratory, application of lean manufacturing principles in a laboratory
- Lean manufacturing, a process improvement discipline
- Lean product development, lean thinking applied to product development
- Lean project management, application of lean concepts to project management
- Lean services, application of lean manufacturing principles in a service operation
- Lean software development, lean manufacturing principles applied to software development
- Lean startup, how to start a company in a lean way

== Other uses ==
- Lean (drug), based on cough syrup
- Lean (name), a surname and given name
- Lean (proof assistant), a mathematical proof assistant and programming language
- Le'an County, in Jiangxi, China
- Lean meat, meat with little fat content
- An alternate name of lake trout (Salvelinus namaycush), a fish
- A slight advantage for one candidate in political forecasting

== See also ==
- Lien (disambiguation)
- Leen (disambiguation)
- Leane (disambiguation)
