= Lean IT =

Application of lean principles in information technology

Lean IT is the extension of lean manufacturing and lean services principles to the development and management of information technology (IT) products and services. Its central concern, applied in the context of IT, is the elimination of waste, where waste is work that adds no value to a product or service.

organization's culture.

== History ==
In 1988, American engineer John Krafcik published an article entitled "Triumph of the Lean Production System", based on his thesis at the Massachusetts Institute of Technology's (MIT) Sloan School of Management. Prior to this, Krafcik was a quality engineer at NUMMI (New United Motor Manufacturing), a Toyota - General Motors joint venture in Fremont, California.

At MIT, Krafcik's research continued as part of the International Motor Vehicle Program (IMVP), which led to the publication, in 1990, of The Machine That Changed the World, co-authored by James Tim Womack (en), Daniel T. Jones and Daniel Ross. The book was a worldwide success.

The lean school was formalized in the US in the 1990s, popularized by the book Lean Thinking (1996) by Daniel T. Jones and James P. Womack (the latter trained in Hajime Ohba's methods as part of Toyota's supplier support unit in the USA).

== Extension to IT ==
As lean manufacturing has become more widely implemented, the extension of lean principles is beginning to spread to IT (and other service industries). Industry analysts have identified many similarities or analogues between IT and manufacturing. For example, whereas the manufacturing function manufactures goods of value to customers, the IT function "manufactures" business services of value to the parent organization and its customers. Similar to manufacturing, the development of business services entails resource management, demand management, quality control, security issues, and so on.

Moreover, the migration by businesses across virtually every industry sector towards greater use of online or e-business services suggests a likely intensified interest in Lean IT as the IT function becomes intrinsic to businesses' primary activities of delivering value to their customers. Already, even today, IT's role in business is substantial, often providing services that enable customers to discover, order, pay, and receive support. IT also provides enhanced employee productivity through software and communications technologies and allows suppliers to collaborate, deliver, and receive payment.

Consultants and evangelists for Lean IT identify an abundance of waste across the business service "production line", including legacy infrastructure and fractured processes. By reducing waste through application of lean Enterprise IT Management (EITM) strategies, CIOs and CTOs in companies such as Tesco, Fujitsu Services, and TransUnion are driving IT from the confines of a back-office support function to a central role in delivering customer value.

== Types of waste ==
Lean IT promises to identify and eradicate waste that otherwise contributes to poor customer service, lost business, higher than necessary business costs, and lost employee productivity. To these ends, Lean IT targets eight elements within IT operations that add no value to the finished product or service or to the parent organization (see Table 1).

Table 1 – Targets of waste in lean IT
Waste element	Examples	Business outcome
Defects	Unauthorized system and application changes.; Substandard project execution.	Poor customer service, increased costs.
Overproduction (overprovisioning)	Unnecessary delivery of low-value applications and services.	Business and IT misalignment, Increased costs and overheads: energy, data center space, maintenance.
Waiting	Slow application response times.; Manual service escalation procedures.	Lost revenue, poor customer service, reduced productivity.
Non-Value Added Processing	Reporting technology metrics to business managers.	Miscommunication.
Transportation	On-site visits to resolve hardware and software issues.; Physical software, security and compliance audits.	Higher capital and operational expenses.
Inventory (excess)	Server sprawl, underutilized hardware.; Multiple repositories to handle risks and control.; Benched application development teams.	Increased costs: data center, energy; lost productivity.
Motion (excess)	Fire-fighting repeat problems within the IT infrastructure and applications.	Lost productivity.
Employee knowledge (unused)	Failing to capture ideas/innovation.; Knowledge and experience retention issues.; Employees spend time on repetitive or mundane tasks.	Talent leakage, low job satisfaction, increased support and maintenance costs.

Whereas each element in the table can be a significant source of waste in itself, linkages between elements sometimes create a cascade of waste (the so-called domino effect). For example, a faulty load balancer (waste element: Defects) that increases web server response time may cause a lengthy wait for users of a web application (waste element: Waiting), resulting in excessive demand on the customer support call center (waste element: Excess Motion) and, potentially, subsequent visits by account representatives to key customers' sites to quell concerns about the service availability (waste element: Transportation). In the meantime, the company's most likely responses to this problem — for example, introducing additional server capacity and/or redundant load balancing software), and hiring extra customer support agents — may contribute yet more waste elements (Overprovisioning and Excess Inventory).

== Principles ==
=== Value streams ===
IT, value streams the provides service by the IT function to the parent organization for use by customers, suppliers, employees, investors, regulators, the media, and any other stakeholders. These services may be further differentiated into:

- Business services (primary value streams). Examples: point-of-sale transaction processing, ecommerce, and supply chain optimization
- IT services (secondary value streams). Examples: application performance management, data backup, and service catalog

The distinction between primary and secondary value streams is meaningful. Given Lean IT's objective of reducing waste, where waste is work that adds no value to a product or service, IT services are secondary (i.e. subordinate or supportive) to business services. In this way, IT services are tributaries that feed and nourish the primary business service value streams. If an IT service is not contributing value to a business service, it is a source of waste. Such waste is typically exposed by value-stream mapping.

=== Value-stream mapping ===
Lean IT, like its lean manufacturing counterpart, involves a methodology of value-stream mapping — diagramming and analyzing services (value streams) into their component process steps and eliminating any steps (or even entire value streams) that do not deliver value.

=== Flow ===
Flow relates to one of the fundamental concepts of Lean as formulated within the Toyota Production System — namely, mura. A Japanese word that translates as "unevenness," mura is eliminated through just-in-time systems that are tightly integrated. For example, a server provisioning process may carry little or no inventory (a waste element in Table 1 above) with labor and materials flowing smoothly into and through the value stream.

A focus on mura reduction and flow may bring benefits that would be otherwise missed by focus on muda (the Japanese word for waste) alone. The former necessitates a system-wide approach whereas the latter may produce suboptimal results and unintended consequences. For example, a software development team may produce code in a language familiar to its members and which is optimal for the team (zero muda). But if that language lacks an API standard by which business partners may access the code, a focus on mura will expose this otherwise hidden source of waste.

=== Pull/demand system ===
Pull (also known as demand) systems are themselves closely related to the aforementioned flow concept. They contrast with push or supply systems. In a pull system, a pull is a service request. The initial request is from the customer or consumer of the product or service. For example, a customer initiates an online purchase. That initial request in turn triggers a subsequent request (for example, a query to a database to confirm product availability), which in turn triggers additional requests (input of the customer's credit card information, credit verification, processing of the order by the accounts department, issuance of a shipping request, replenishment through the supply-chain management system, and so on).

Push systems differ markedly. Unlike the "bottom-up," demand-driven, pull systems, they are "top-down," supply-driven systems whereby the supplier plans or estimates demand. Push systems typically accumulate large inventory stockpiles in anticipation of customer need. In IT, push systems often introduce waste through an over-abundance of "just-in-case" inventory, incorrect product or service configuration, version control problems, and incipient quality issues.

== Implementation ==
Implementation begins with identification and description of one or more IT value streams. For example, aided by use of interviews and questionnaires, the value stream for a primary value stream such as a point-of-sale business service may be described as shown in Table 2.

Table 2 – Example: Description of a point-of-sale value stream
		Value metrics	Demand pulls	SLIs
"Owner" of Business Result	EVP of Store Operations	CAPEX; OPEX; Labor efficiency; Ease of use; Check-out speed	Budget reviews; Strategic reviews; Store redesign; Store openings	Transaction speed; Service continuity; Implementation speed
End Customer	Cashiers	Check-out speed; Ease of use	Transactions; Log ons	Transaction speed; Service continuity
End Customer	Shoppers	Payment types; Check-out speed; Ease of use	Transactions	Transaction speed; Service continuity

Table 2 suggests that the Executive Vice President (EVP) of Store Operations is ultimately responsible for the point-of-sale business service, and he/she assesses the value of this service using metrics such as CAPEX, OPEX, and check-out speed. The demand pulls or purposes for which the EVP may seek these metrics might be to conduct a budget review or undertake a store redesign. Formal service-level agreements (SLAs) for provision of the business service may monitor transaction speed, service continuity, and implementation speed. The table further illustrates how other users of the point-of-sale service — notably, cashiers and shoppers — may be concerned with other value metrics, demand pulls, and SLAs.

Having identified and described a value stream, implementation usually proceeds with construction of a value stream map — a pictorial representation of the flow of information, beginning with an initial demand request or pull and progressing up the value stream. Although value streams are not as readily visualizable as their counterparts in lean manufacturing, where the flow of materials is more tangible, systems engineers and IT consultants are practiced in the construction of schematics to represent information flow through an IT service. To this end, they may use productivity software such as Microsoft Visio and computer-aided design (CAD) tools. However, alternatives to these off-the-shelf applications may be more efficient (and less wasteful) in the mapping process.

One alternative is use of a configuration management database (CMDB), which describes the authorized configuration of the significant components of an IT environment. Workload automation software, which helps IT organizations optimize real-time performance of complex business workloads across diverse IT infrastructures, and other application dependency mapping tools can be an additional help in value stream mapping.

After mapping one or more value streams, engineers and consultants analyze the stream(s) for sources of waste. The analysis may adapt and apply traditional efficiency techniques such as time-and-motion studies as well as more recent lean techniques developed for the Toyota Production System and its derivatives. Among likely outcomes are methods such as process redesign, the establishment of "load-balanced" workgroups (for example, cross-training of software developers to work on diverse projects according to changing business needs), and the development of performance management "dashboards" to track project and business performance and highlight trouble spots.

== Trends ==
=== Recessionary pressure to reduce costs ===
The onset of economic recession in December 2007 was marked by a decrease in individuals' willingness to pay for goods and services — especially in face of uncertainty about their own economic futures. Meanwhile, tighter business and consumer credit, a steep decline in the housing market, higher taxes, massive lay-offs, and diminished returns in the money and bond markets have further limited demand for goods and services.

When an economy is strong, most business leaders focus on revenue growth. During periods of weakness, when demand for good and services is curbed, the focus shifts to cost-cutting. In-keeping with this tendency, recessions initially provoke aggressive (and sometimes panic-ridden) actions such as deep discounting, fire sales of excess inventory, wage freezes, short-time working, and abandonment of former supplier relationships in favor of less costly supplies. Although such actions may be necessary and prudent, their impact may be short-lived. Lean IT can expect to garner support during economic downturns as business leaders seek initiatives that deliver more enduring value than is achievable through reactive and generalized cost-cutting.

=== Proliferation of online transactions ===
IT has traditionally been a mere support function of business, in common with other support functions such as shipping and accounting. More recently, however, companies have moved many mission-critical business functions to the Web. This migration is likely to accelerate still further as companies seek to leverage investments in service-oriented architectures, decrease costs, improve efficiency, and increase access to customers, partners, and employees.

The prevalence of web-based transactions is driving a convergence of IT and business. In other words, IT services are increasingly central to the mission of providing value to customers. Lean IT initiatives are accordingly becoming less of a peripheral interest and more of an interest that is intrinsic to the core business.

=== Green IT ===
Though not born of the same motivations, lean IT initiatives are congruent with a broad movement towards conservation and waste reduction, often characterized as green policies and practices. Green IT is one part of this broad movement.

Waste reduction directly correlates with reduced energy consumption and carbon generation. Indeed, IBM asserts that IT and energy costs can account for up to 60% of an organization's capital expenditures and 75% of operational expenditures. In this way, identification and streamlining of IT value streams supports the measurement and improvement of carbon footprints and other green metrics. For instance, implementation of Lean IT initiatives is likely to save energy through adoption of virtualization technology and data center consolidation.

== Challenges ==
=== Value-stream visualization ===
Unlike lean manufacturing, from which the principles and methods of Lean IT derive, Lean IT depends upon value streams that are digital and intangible rather than physical and tangible. This renders difficult the visualization of IT value streams and hence the application of Lean IT. Whereas practitioners of lean manufacturing can apply visual management systems such as the kanban cards used in the Toyota Production System, practitioners of Lean IT must use enterprise IT management tools to help visualize and analyze the more abstract context of IT value streams.

=== Reference implementations ===
As an emerging area in IT management (see Deployment and Commercial Support), lean IT has relatively few reference implementations. Moreover, whereas much of the supporting theory and methodology is grounded in the more established field of lean manufacturing, adaptation of such theory and methodology to the digital service-oriented process of IT is likewise only just beginning. This lack makes implementation challenging, as evidenced by the problems experienced with the March 2008 opening of Heathrow Terminal 5. British airports authority BAA and airline British Airways, which has exclusive use of the new terminal, used process methodologies adapted from the motor industry to speed development and achieve cost savings in developing and integrating systems at the new terminal. However, the opening was marred by baggage handling backlogs, staff parking problems, and cancelled flights.

=== Resistance to change ===
The conclusions or recommendations of Lean IT initiatives are likely to demand organizational, operational, and/or behavioral changes that may meet with resistance from workers, managers, and even senior executives. Whether driven by a fear of job losses, a belief that existing work practices are superior, or some other concern, such changes may encounter resistance. For example, a lean IT recommendation to introduce flexible staffing whereby application development and maintenance managers share personnel is often met with resistance by individual managers who may have relied on certain people for many years. Also, existing incentives and metrics may not align with the proposed staff sharing.

=== Fragmented IT departments ===
Even though business services and the ensuing flow of information may span multiple departments, IT organizations are commonly structured in a series of operational or technology-centric silos, each with its own management tools and methods to address perhaps just one particular aspect of waste. Unfortunately, fragmented efforts at Lean IT contribute little benefit because they lack the integration necessary to manage cumulative waste across the value chain.

=== Integration of lean production and lean consumption ===
Related to the aforementioned issue of fragmented IT departments is the lack of integration across the entire supply chain, including not only all business partners but also consumers. To this end, lean IT consultants have recently proposed so-called lean consumption of products and services as a complement to lean production. In this regard, the processes of provision and consumption are tightly integrated and streamlined to minimize total cost and waste and to create new sources of value.

== Deployment and commercial support ==
Deployment of lean IT has been predominantly limited to application development and maintenance (ADM). This focus reflects the cost of ADM. Despite a trend towards increased ADM outsourcing to lower-wage economies, the cost of developing and maintaining applications can still consume more than half of the total IT budget. In this light, the potential of Lean IT to increase productivity by as much as 40% while improving the quality and speed of execution makes ADM a primary target within the IT department.

Opportunity to apply Lean IT exists in multiple other areas of IT besides ADM. For example, service catalog management is a Lean IT approach to provisioning IT services. When, say, a new employee joins a company, the employee's manager can log into a web-based catalog and select the services needed. This particular employee may need a CAD workstation as well as standard office productivity software and limited access to the company's extranet. On submitting this request, provisioning of all hardware and software requirements would then be automatic through a lean value stream. In another example, a Lean IT approach to application performance monitoring would automatically detect performance issues at the customer experience level as well as triage, notify support personnel, and collect data to assist in root-cause analysis. Research suggests that IT departments may achieve sizable returns from investing in these and other areas of the IT function.

Among notable corporate examples of Lean IT adopters is UK-based grocer Tesco, which has entered into strategic partnerships with many of its suppliers, including Procter & Gamble, Unilever, and Coca-Cola, eventually succeeding in replacing weekly shipments with continuous deliveries throughout the day. By moving to eliminate stock from either the back of the store or in high-bay storage, Tesco has gotten markedly closer to a just-in-time pull system (see Pull/demand system). Lean IT is also attracting public-sector interest, in-keeping with the waste-reduction aims of the lean government movement. One example is the City of Cape Coral, Florida, where several departments have deployed lean IT. The city's police records department, for instance, reviewed its processing of some 20,000 traffic tickets written by police officers each year, halving the time for an officer to write a ticket and saving $2 million. Comparable benefits have been achieved in other departments such as public works, finance, fire, and parks and recreation.

== Complementary methodologies ==
Although Lean IT typically entails particular principles and methods such as value streams and value-stream mapping, Lean IT is, on a higher level, a philosophy rather than a prescribed metric or process methodology. In this way, Lean IT is pragmatic and agnostic. It seeks incremental waste reduction and value enhancement, but it does not require a grand overhaul of an existing process, and is complementary rather than alternative to other methodologies.

=== Agile, Scrum and lean software development ===
Agile software development is a set of software development methods that originated as a response for the indiscriminated use of CMMI, RUP and PMBOK creating fat and slow software development processes that normally increased the lead time, the work in progress and non-value added/value added activities ratio on projects. Agile software development methods include XP, Scrum, FDD, AUP, DSDM, Crystal, and others.

Scrum is one of the more well known agile methods for project management, and has as one of its origins concepts from Lean Thinking. Scrum also organizes work in a cross-functional, multidisciplinary work cell. It uses some form of kanban system to visualize and limit work in progress, and follows the PDCA cycle, and continuous improvements, that is the base of Lean.

=== Six Sigma ===
Whereas Lean IT focuses on customer satisfaction and reducing waste, Six Sigma focuses on removing the causes of defects (errors) and the variation (inconsistency) in manufacturing and business processes using quality management and, especially, statistical methods. Six Sigma also differs from Lean methods by introducing a special infrastructure of personnel (e.g. so-called "Green Belts" and " Black Belts") in the organization. Six Sigma is more oriented around two particular methods (DMAIC and DMADV), whereas Lean IT employs a portfolio of tools and methods. These differences notwithstanding, Lean IT may be readily combined with Six Sigma such that the latter brings statistical rigor to measurement of the former's outcomes.

=== Capability Maturity Model Integration (CMMI) ===
The Capability Maturity Model Integration (CMMI) from the Software Engineering Institute of Carnegie Mellon University (Pittsburgh, Pennsylvania) is a process improvement approach applicable to a single project, a division, or an entire organization. It helps integrate traditionally separate organizational functions, set process improvement goals and priorities, provide guidance for quality processes, and provide a benchmark or point of reference for assessing current processes. However, unlike Lean IT, CMMI (and other process models) doesn't directly address sources of waste such as a lack of alignment between business units and the IT function or unnecessary architectural complexity within a software application.

=== ITIL ===
ITIL contains concepts, policies, and recommended practices on a broad range of IT management topics. These are again entirely compatible with the objectives and methods of Lean IT. Indeed, as another best-practice framework, ITIL may be considered alongside the CMMI for process improvement and COBIT for IT governance.

=== Universal Service Management Body of Knowledge (USMBOK) ===
The Universal Service Management Body of Knowledge (USMBOK) — is a single book published by Service Management 101 and endorsed by numerous professional trade associations as the definitive reference for service management. The USMBOK contains a detailed specification of a service system and organization and leverages the rich history of service management as defined within product management and marketing professions. The service organization specification describes seven key knowledge domains, equivalent to roles, and forty knowledge areas, representing areas of practice and skills. Amongst these, within the Service Value Management knowledge domain, are a number of Lean relevant skills, including Lean Thinking and Value Mapping. The USMBOK also provides detailed information on how problem management and lean thinking are combined with outside-in (customer centric) thinking, in the design of a continuous improvement program.

=== COBIT ===
Control Objectives for Information and Related Technology – better known as COBIT – is a framework or set of best practices for IT management created by the Information Systems Audit and Control Association (ISACA), and the IT Governance Institute (ITGI). It provides managers, auditors, and IT users a set of metrics, processes, and best practices to assist in maximizing the benefits derived through the use of IT, achieving compliance with regulations such as Sarbanes-Oxley, and aligning IT investments with business objectives. COBIT also aims to unify global IT standards, including ITIL, CMMI, and ISO 17799.
