= Lean (name) =

Lean is a surname of Irish/Scottish or Chinese origin. It can also be a given name. Notable people with the name include:

== Surname ==
- Alexander Lean (1824–1893), New Zealand runholder, architect, military volunteer, and musician
- Beh Gaik Lean (born c. 1952), Malaysian chief
- Big Lean (born 1989), Canadian rapper
- Bill Lean (1941–2015), New Zealand Paralympic athlete
- Catherine De Léan, (born 1980), Canadian actress
- Cecil Lean (1878–1935), American actor
- David Lean (1908–1991), English filmmaker
- David Lean (athlete) (born 1935), Australian athlete
- David Lean (politician) (born 1945), Australian politician
- Eric Lean (born 1938), Taiwanese electrical engineer
- Fredric Lean, French-American documentary filmmaker
- Hooi Hooi Lean, Malaysian economist
- Jack Lean (1899–1965), Australian rules footballer
- James Lean (1888–1975), Scottish politician
- Jonathan Lean (born 1952), Welsh Anglican dean
- Judith Lean, Australian-American solar and climate scientist
- Michele Lean (born 1982), Malaysian public figure and writer
- Norman Mac Lean, Canadian-American sportswriter
- Tangye Lean (1911–1974), British author
- Yung Lean (born 1996), Swedish musician

== Given name ==
- Lean Alejandro (1960–1987), Filipino activist
- Lean Bear (c. 1813–1864), Cheyenne peace chief
- Lim Lean Teng (1870–1963), Chinese businessperson

== See also ==
- McLean
- Lean (disambiguation)
