= Takt time =

Manufacturing term

Takt time, or simply takt, is a manufacturing term to describe the required product assembly duration that is needed to match the demand. Often confused with cycle time, takt time is a tool used to design work and it measures the average time interval between the start of production of one unit and the start of production of the next unit when items are produced sequentially. For calculations, it is the time to produce parts divided by the number of parts demanded in that time interval. The takt time is based on customer demand; if a process or a production line are unable to produce at takt time, either demand leveling, additional resources, or process re-engineering is needed to ensure on-time delivery.

For example, if the customer demand is 10 units per week, then, given a 40-hour workweek and steady flow through the production line, the average duration between production starts should be 4 hours, ideally. This interval is further reduced to account for things like machine downtime and scheduled employee breaks.

== Etymology ==
Takt time is a borrowing of the Japanese word takuto taimu (タクトタイム), which in turn was borrowed from the German word Taktzeit, meaning 'cycle time'. The word was likely introduced to Japan by German engineers in the 1930s.

The word originates from the Latin word "tactus" meaning "touch, sense of touch, feeling". Some earlier meanings include: (16th century) "beat triggered by regular contact, clock beat", then in music "beat indicating the rhythm" and (18th century) "regular unit of note values".

== History ==
Takt time has played an important role in production systems even before the industrial revolution. From 16th-century shipbuilding in Venice, mass-production of Model T by Henry Ford, synchronizing airframe movement in the German aviation industry and many more. Cooperation between the German aviation industry and Mitsubishi brought takt to Japan, where Toyota incorporated it in the Toyota Production System (TPS).

James P. Womack and Daniel T. Jones in The Machine That Changed the World (1990) and Lean Thinking (1996) introduced the world to the concept of "lean". Through this, Takt was connected to lean systems. In the Toyota Production System (TPS), takt time is a central element of the just-in-time pillar (JIT) of this production system.

== Definition ==
Assuming a product is made one unit at a time at a constant rate during the net available work time, the takt time is the amount of time that must elapse between two consecutive unit completions in order to meet the demand.

Takt time can be first determined with the formula:

$$T = \frac{T_{a}}{D}$$

Where
T = Takt time (or takt), e.g. [work time between two consecutive units]
T_{a} = Net time available to work during the period, e.g. [work time per period]
D = Demand (customer demand) during the period, e.g. [units required per period]

Net available time is the amount of time available for work to be done. This excludes break times and any expected stoppage time (for example scheduled maintenance, team briefings, etc.).

Example:
If there are a total of 8 hours (or 480 minutes) in a shift (gross time) less 30 minutes lunch, 30 minutes for breaks (2 × 15 mins), 10 minutes for a team briefing and 10 minutes for basic maintenance checks, then the net Available Time to Work = 480 - 30 - 30 - 10 - 10 = 400 minutes.

If customer demand were 400 units a day and one shift was being run, then the line would be required to output at a minimum rate of one part per minute in order to be able to keep up with customer demand.

Takt time may be adjusted according to requirements within a company. For example, if one department delivers parts to several manufacturing lines, it often makes sense to use similar takt times on all lines to smooth outflow from the preceding station. Customer demand can still be met by adjusting daily working time, reducing down times on machines, and so on.

== Implementation ==
Takt time is common in production lines that move a product along a line of stations that each performs a set of predefined tasks.

- Manufacturing: casting of parts, drilling holes, or preparing a workplace for another task
- Control tasks: testing of parts or adjusting machinery
- Administration: answering standard inquiries or call center operation
- Construction Management: scheduling process steps within a phase of the project

== Takt in construction ==
With the adoption of lean thinking in the construction industry, takt time has found its way into the project-based production systems of the industry. Starting with construction methods that have highly repetitive products like bridge construction, tunnel construction, and repetitive buildings like hotels and residential high-rises, implementation of takt is increasing.

According to Koskela (1992), an ideal production system has continuous flow and creates value for the customer while transforming raw materials into products. Construction projects use critical path method (CPM) or program evaluation and review technique (PERT) for planning and scheduling. These methods do not generate flow in the production and tend to be vulnerable to variation in the system. Due to common cost and schedule overruns, industry professionals and academia have started to regard CPM and PERT as outdated methods that often fail to anticipate uncertainties and allocate resources accurately and optimally in a dynamic construction environment. This has led to increasing developments and implementation of takt.

=== Space scheduling ===
Takt, as used in takt planning or takt-time planning (TTP) for construction, is considered one of the several ways of planning and scheduling construction projects based on their utilization of space rather than just time, as done traditionally in the critical path method. Also, to visualize and create flow of work on a construction site, utilization of space becomes essential. Some other space scheduling methods include:

- Linear scheduling method (LSM) and vertical production method (VPM) which are used to schedule horizontal and vertical repetitive projects respectively,
- Line-of-balance (LOB) method used for any type of repetitive projects.
- Location-based management system (LBMS) uses flowlines with the production rates of the crews, as they move through locations with an objective of optimizing work continuity.

=== Comparison with manufacturing ===
In manufacturing, the product being built keeps moving on the assembly line, while the workstations are stationary. On contrary, construction product, i.e. the building or infrastructure facilities being constructed, is stationary and the workers move from one location to another.

Takt planning needs an accurate definition of work at each workstation, which in construction is done through defining spaces, called "zones". Due to the non-repetitive distribution of work in construction, achieving work completion within the defined takt for each zone, becomes difficult. Capacity buffer is used to deal with this variability in the system.

The rationale behind defining these zones and setting the takt is not standardized and varies as per the style of the planner. Work density method (WDM) is one of the methods being used to assist in this process. Work density is expressed as a unit of time per unit of area. For a certain work area, work density describes how much time a trade will require to do their work in that area (zone), based on:

1. the product's design, i.e., what is in the construction project drawings and specifications
2. the scope of the trade's work,
3. the specific task in their schedule (depending on work already in place and work that will follow later in the same or another process),
4. the means and methods the trade will use (e.g., when prefabricating off-site, the work density on-site is expected to decrease),
5. while accounting for crew capabilities and size.

== Benefits of takt time ==
Once a takt system is implemented there are a number of benefits:

- The product moves along a line, so bottlenecks (stations that need more time than planned) are easily identified when the product does not move on in time.
- Correspondingly, stations that don't operate reliably (suffer a frequent breakdown, etc.) are easily identified.
- The takt leaves only a certain amount of time to perform the actual value added work. Therefore, there is a strong motivation to get rid of all non-value-adding tasks (like machine set-up, gathering of tools, transporting products, etc.)
- Workers and machines perform sets of similar tasks, so they don't have to adapt to new processes every day, increasing their productivity.
- There is no place in the takt system for removal of a product from the assembly line at any point before completion, so opportunities for shrink and damage in transit are minimized.

== Problems of takt time ==
Once a takt system is implemented there are a number of problems:

- When customer demand rises so much that takt time has to come down, quite a few tasks have to be either reorganized to take even less time to fit into the shorter takt time, or they have to be split up between two stations (which means another station has to be squeezed into the line and workers have to adapt to the new setup)
- When one station in the line breaks down for whatever reason the whole line comes to a grinding halt, unless there are buffer capacities for preceding stations to get rid of their products and following stations to feed from. A built-in buffer of three to five percent downtime allows needed adjustments or recovery from failures.
- Short takt time can put considerable stress on the "moving parts" of a production system or subsystem. In automated systems/subsystems, increased mechanical stress increases the likelihood of a breakdown, and in non-automated systems/subsystems, personnel face both increased physical stress (which increases the risk of repetitive motion (also "stress" or "strain") injury), intensified emotional stress, and lowered motivation, sometimes to the point of increased absenteeism.
- Tasks have to be leveled to make sure tasks don't bulk in front of certain stations due to peaks in workload. This decreases the flexibility of the system as a whole.
- The concept of takt time doesn't account for human factors such as an operator needing an unexpected bathroom break or a brief rest period between units (especially for processes involving significant physical labor). In practice, this means that the production processes must be realistically capable of operation above peak takt and demand must be leveled in order to avoid wasted line capacity

== See also ==
- Turnaround time
- Lean manufacturing
- Toyota Production System
- Muri
- Lean construction
- Factory Physics, a book on manufacturing management
- Clock-face scheduling, sometimes referred to as Taktplan
