= Lean consumption =

Lean consumption is based on lean manufacturing, also known as lean production. Lean Manufacturing was pioneered by Toyota founder Taiichi Ohno, and revolutionized and streamlined the manufacturing industry. Whereas lean manufacturing set out ways to streamline manufacturing processes, lean consumption "minimizes customers' time and effort by delivering exactly what they want when and where they want it". Processes are focused on eliminating waste, while increasing productivity, speed of operation and improving customer interaction.

== History ==
In the fall of 2005, James P. Womack and Daniel T. Jones published an article in the Harvard Business Review describing a new theory called Lean Consumption. This process was proposed for large corporations, but smaller corporations have been able to take this theory and apply it to small business. This has the effect of more efficient business and better customer service and SLAs. Related fields to Lean Consumption include:

- Lean thinking
- Six Sigma
- Theory of constraints

== Principles of lean consumption ==
- Solve the customer's problem completely by ensuring that all the goods and services work, and work together.
- Don't waste the customer's time.
- Provide exactly what the customer wants.
- Provide what's wanted exactly where it's wanted.
- Provide what's wanted where it's wanted, exactly when it's wanted.
- Continually aggregate solutions to reduce the customer's time and hassle.

== Methodology ==
- Identify and improve activities that create and add value for the customer.
- Determine what processes are necessary to deliver that value.
- Cut down on activities that do not add value.
- Deliver products precisely when the customer requires them.
- Improve and streamline these processes continuously.

== Companies that use lean consumption and variations ==
- IBM
- Microsoft
- Motorola
- Toyota
- List of Six Sigma companies

== Lean consumption in the IT Industry ==
The industry most affected by Lean Consumption is the IT and Computer Services Industry. Companies like Microsoft and IBM are the most notable companies to employ Lean Consumption or some variation of the theory. A notable smaller adoptee is Cybernomics, which has been able to employ Lean Consumption theory to better satisfy customers by giving them exactly what they require when they require it and at the same time, planning ahead with Proactive IT to avoid break-fix situations, all while lowering cost to the end user.

== External sources ==
- Lean Enterprise Institute
