= Lean services =

Lean services is the application of lean manufacturing production methods in the service industry (and related method adaptations). Lean services have among others been applied to US health care providers and the UK HMRC.

== History ==
Definition of "Service": see Service, Business Service and/or Service Economics. Lean Services history, see Lean manufacturing.

Lean manufacturing and Services, contrasted by Levitt; "Manufacturing looks for solutions inside the very tasks to be done... Service looks for solutions in the performer of the task." (T.Levitt, Production-Line Approach to Service, Harvard Business Review, September 1972).

== Method ==
Underlying method; Lean manufacturing.

Bicheno & Holweg provides an adapted view on waste for the method ("waste", see Lean manufacturing, waste and The Toyota Way, principle 2):

1. Delay on the part of customers waiting for service, for delivery, in queues, for response, not arriving as promised.
2. Duplication. Having to re-enter data, repeat details on forms, copy information across, answer queries from several sources within the same organisation.
3. Unnecessary Movement. Queuing several times, lack of one-stop, poor ergonomics in the service encounter.
4. Unclear communication, and the wastes of seeking clarification, confusion over product or service use, wasting time finding a location that may result in misuse or duplication.
5. Incorrect inventory. Being out-of-stock, unable to get exactly what was required, substitute products or services.
6. An opportunity lost to retain or win customers, a failure to establish rapport, ignoring customers, unfriendliness, and rudeness.
7. Errors in the service transaction, product defects in the product-service bundle, lost or damaged goods.
8. Service quality errors, lack of quality in service processes.

Shillingburg and Seddon separately provides an additional type of waste for the method:

1. Value Demand, services demanded by the customer. Failure Demand, production of services as a result of defects in the upstream system.

== Criticism ==
John Seddon outlines challenges with Lean Services in his paper "Rethinking Lean Service" (Seddon 2009) using examples from the UK tax-authorities HMRC.

== See also ==
- Lean construction
- Lean government
- Lean Higher Education
- Lean IT
