= Shared services =

Method for provisioning shared organizational resources

Shared services is the provision of a service by one part of an organization or group where that service had previously been found in more than one part of the organization or group. Thus the funding and resourcing of the service is shared and the providing department effectively becomes an internal service provider. The key here is the idea of 'sharing' within an organization or group. This sharing needs to fundamentally include shared accountability of results by the unit from where the work is migrated to the provider. The provider, on the other hand, needs to ensure that the agreed results are delivered based on defined measures (KPIs, cost, quality etc.).

== Overview ==
Shared services is similar to collaboration that might take place between different organizations such as a Hospital Trust or a Police Force. For example, adjacent Trusts might decide to collaborate by merging their HR or IT functions.

There are two arguments for sharing services: The ‘less of a common resource' argument and the ‘efficiency through industrialization' argument. The former is ‘obvious': if you have fewer managers, IT systems, buildings etc; if you use less of some resource, it will reduce costs. The second argument is ‘efficiency through industrialization’. This argument assumes that efficiencies follow from specialization and standardization – resulting in the creation of ‘front' and ‘back' offices. The typical method is to simplify, standardize and then centralize, using an IT 'solution' as the means.

Shared services is different from the model of outsourcing, which is where an external third party is paid to provide a service that was previously internal to the buying organization, typically leading to redundancies and re-organization. There is an ongoing debate about the advantages of shared services over outsourcing. It is sometimes assumed that a joint venture between a government department and a commercial organization is an example of shared services. The joint venture involves the creation of a separate legal commercial entity (jointly owned), which provides profit to its shareholders.

Traditionally the development of a shared-service organization (SSO) or shared-service centre (SSC) within an organization is an attempt to reduce costs (often attempted through economies of scale), standardized processes (through centralization). A global Service Center Benchmark study carried out by the Shared Services & Outsourcing Network (SSON) and the Hackett Group, which surveyed more than 250 companies, found that only about a third of all participants were able to generate cost savings of 20% or greater from their SSOs. At NASA, the 2006 switch to a shared services model is realizing nearly $20 million of savings annually. Further, by the end of 2015, the NASA Shared Services Center is expected to save the organization a total of over $200 million, according to NASA's Director of Service Delivery.

A large-scale cultural and process transformation can be a key component of a move to shared services and may include redundancies and changes of work practices. It is claimed that transformation often results in a better quality of work life for employees although there are few case studies to back this up.

Shared services are more than just centralization or consolidation of similar activities in one location. Shared services can mean running these service activities like a business and delivering services to internal customers at a cost, quality, and timeliness that is competitive with alternatives.

== Commercial structures ==
A shared service can take a variety of different commercial structures. The basic commercial structures include:

Unitary
A single organization consolidating and centralizing a business service
Lead department: An organization consolidating and centralizing a business service that will be shared by other organizations
Joint initiatives
Agreement between two or more organizations to set up and operate shared services

== Location variations ==
It is sometimes argued that there are three basic location variations for a shared service including:

On-shore
Work is carried out in the same country but at a different location
Near-shore
Work is carried out in a close location (e.g. continental Europe relative to the UK)
Off-shore
Work is carried out anywhere in the world that is not on-shore or near-shore

This is not to take advantage of both wage arbitrage and the available talents of particular economies in delivering specific service offerings.

The difficulty with this argument is that near-shore and off-shore are normally associated with the outsourcing model and are difficult to reconcile with the notion of an internally shared service as distinct from an externally purchased service. Clearly, the use of off-shore facilities by a government department is not an example of shared services.

== Benchmarking and measurement ==
In establishing and running a shared service, benchmarking and measurement is considered by some as a necessity. Benchmarking is the comparison of the service provision usually against best in class. The measurement occurs by using agreed key performance indicators (KPIs). Although the amount of KPIs chosen differs greatly it is generally accepted that fewer than 10 carefully chosen KPIs will deliver the best results.

Organizations do attempt to define benchmarks for processes and business operations.

Benchmarking can be used to achieve different goals including:
1. To drive performance improvements using benchmarks as a means for setting performance targets that are met either through incremental performance improvements or transformational change.
- Strategic: with a focus on a long-term horizon; and
- Tactical: with a focus on the short and medium term

2. To focus an organization on becoming world class with processes that deliver the highest levels of performance that are better than those of its peer group.

== In the private sector ==
The private sector has been moving towards shared services since the beginning of the 1980s. Large organizations such as the BBC, BP, Bristol Myers Squibb, Ford, GE, HP, Pfizer, Rolls-Royce, ArcelorMittal, and SAP are operating them with great success. According to the English Institute of Chartered Accountants, more than 30% of U.S. Fortune 500 companies have implemented a shared-service center, and are reporting cost savings in their general accounting functions of up to 46%.

The conventional accounting practice used to generate these figures is disputed however by management thinker Professor John Seddon, who argues that the measurement known as 'unit cost' tells you nothing about overall costs. Overall costs include 'failure demand', which is defined as a failure to do something or do something right for the customer.

== In the public sector ==
The public sector has taken note of the benefits derived in the private sector and continues to strive for best practice. The United States and Australia among others have had shared services in government since the late 1990s. However, the failures of these projects are increasingly being reported by the press and exposed by opposition politicians.

=== UK ===
The UK government under a central drive to efficiency following from the Gershon Review are working to an overall plan for realizing the benefits of shared services. The Cabinet Office has established a team specifically tasked with the role of accelerating the take up and developing the strategy for all government departments to converge and consolidate. The savings potential of this transformation in the UK Public Sector was initially estimated by the Cabinet Office at £1.4bn per annum (20% of the estimated cost of HR and Finance functions). The National Audit Office (United Kingdom) in its November 2007 report pointed out that this £1.4bn figure lacked a clear baseline of costs and contained several uncertainties, such as the initial expenditure required and the time frame for the savings.

There are reports of UK government shared service centres failing to realise savings, such as the Department of Transport's project, described as 'stupendous incompetence' by the Parliament's Public Accounts Committee.

The Northern Ireland Civil Service (NICS), has implemented shared services for a number of departments and functions. For example, IT Assist (the ICT Shared Service Centre) provides common infrastructure and desktop services to NICS staff in the office, at home or when mobile working.

=== Canada ===
The government of Canada instituted Shared Services Canada on August 4, 2011, with the objective of consolidating its data centres, networks and email systems. This followed a tendency to centralize IT services which had been followed by the provinces of British Columbia, Québec, and Ontario, as well as the federal government of the United States of America and some states like Texas. PriceWaterhouseCoopers recommended integrating government data centres in a report ordered by Public Works and Government Services Canada, revealed in December 2011.

=== Ireland ===
In the Republic of Ireland, the health service nationally has been reorganized from a set of regional Health Boards to a unified national structure, the Health Services Executive. Within this structure there will be a National Shared Services Organisation, based on the model developed at the former Eastern Health Shared Services, where procurement, HR, finance and ICT services were provided to health agencies in the Eastern Region of Ireland on a business-to business basis.

== New trends ==
Organizations that have centralized their IT functions have now begun to take a close look at the technology services that their IT departments provide to internal customers, evaluating where it makes sense to provide specific technology components as a shared service. E-mail and scanning operations were obvious early candidates; many organizations with document-intensive operations are deploying scanning centers as a shared service.

Many large organizations, in both the public and private sectors, are now considering deploying enterprise content management (ECM) technology as a shared service.

== See also ==
- Integration competency center
- Offshoring
- Outsourcing
- Offshoring Research Network
- Portable employer of record
- Shared services center
