= Leen =

Leen may refer to:

- Leen (given name)
- Leen (surname)
- River Leen, a river in England

== See also ==
- Leens, a village in the Dutch province of Groningen
- Lean (disambiguation)
