= Leen (surname) =

Leen is a surname. Notable people with the surname include:

- Bill Leen (born 1962), American musician
- Craig Leen (born 1975), American lawyer and former federal agency head
- Nina Leen (died 1995), Russian-American photographer
- Randy Leen (born 1975), American golfer
- Willem van Leen (1753–1825), Dutch painter
- Willie Joe Leen, Irish hurler
- James Leen, (1888-1949), Irish Bishop

== See also ==
- Leen (given name)
- Lean (disambiguation)
