= Lean laboratory =

A lean laboratory is one which is focused on processes, procedures, and infrastructure that deliver results in the most efficient way in terms of cost, speed, or both. Lean laboratory is a management and organization process derived from the concept of lean manufacturing and the Toyota Production System (TPS). The goal of a lean laboratory is to reduce resource usage and costs while improving productivity, staff morale, and laboratory-driven outcomes.

== Overview ==
Manufacturing companies, including medical device and pharmaceutical manufacturers, operate in highly regulated environments which often necessitate a great deal of resources, time, and money being expended in the testing, release, and quality assurance of their products. Since the early 1990s, there has been a more widespread drive to adopt more lean approaches both in the manufacturing and testing of products. The advances in lean thinking developed and refined in the automotive industry initially by Toyota (TPS) are now being used as best practices across most manufacturing sectors. The idea of lean laboratory shares its origins with lean manufacturing and uses the same tools to deliver the most efficient and least wasteful processes, tools such as Kaizen, Just In Time (JIT), Heijunka, Kanban, and Six Sigma.

The principles of lean manufacturing have been difficult at times to migrate to laboratories because they are quite different from manufacturing environments. In the hospital laboratory, for example, difficulties arise with the "staunch adherence to traditional laboratory practices, complexity of workflow, and marked variability in sample numbers." In pharmaceutical and biopharmaceutical labs, "the limiting belief" that procedures are so different that lean won't work often slow down adoption. Compared to manufacturing environments, most analytical and microbiological laboratories have a relatively low volume of samples but a high degree of variability and complexity. Many standard lean tools are not a good fit; however, lean can still be applied to these types of labs. A generic approach is not suitable for laboratories, but careful adaptation of the techniques based on a thorough understanding of lab operations will deliver significant benefits in terms of cost, speed, or both.

== Conventional laboratories ==
It is a common occurrence for testing laboratories to suffer from long and variable lead times. Some of the problems or issues which can be attributed to conventional or “non lean” laboratories include the following issues.

=== Lack of focus ===
Analysts and microbiologists are typically focused on test accuracy and individual test run efficiency. Very often, personnel are dedicated to specific tests and there is little or no control of the progress of individual samples through a sometimes highly variable test routing that can be dependent on product type and/or the intended market.

=== Long and variable lead times ===
In many test laboratories, it is normal to find queues in front of each test where individual samples wait until enough similar samples arrive to constitute an "efficient test run." This approach causes long and variable lead times and, contrary to popular belief, does not result in higher productivity.

=== Ineffective "fast track" systems ===
To deal with the long lead times, "fast track" systems are often developed in an effort to deal with urgent samples, but these often become unworkable. Frequently, the proportion of samples designated as priority becomes so large that fast tracking quickly becomes ineffective.

=== High levels of work in progress ===
Laboratories often maintain high levels of work in process (WIP), which inevitably results in significant (non value adding) effort being expended in controlling, tracking, and prioritizing samples and in planning analyst work. Companies often respond to this situation by investing in a laboratory information management system (LIMS) or some other IT system. However these systems do not in themselves improve performance. The underlying process by which work is organized and moves through the lab must first be re-engineered based on lean principles.

=== Volatile incoming workload ===
For many testing laboratories, the incoming workload is inherently volatile, with significant peaks and dips. This causes low productivity (during dips) and/or poor lead time performance (during peaks). Very often the capacity of the lab is not well understood, and there is no mechanism to level or smooth the workload.

== Implementing lean in the lab ==
To address the above problems and issues, a lean laboratory uses lean principles to eliminate waste or Muda. There are a number of principles that can be used, but the goal is always primarily focused on improving measurable performance and/or reducing costs.

=== Specify value ===
The first step in designing any lean laboratory is to specify value. Every activity in the laboratory is identified and categorizing as "value added," "non-value added" (from the customers perspective), and "incidental." Incidental work is non value add in itself but is essential to enable value add tasks to be carried out. A significant focus of any lean lab initiative will be to eliminate or reduce the non value add activities.

=== Identify the value stream ===
Another key lean step is to develop value stream maps of the overall release process. This should avoid the error of working on point solutions that only end up moving a bottleneck to another process and therefore do not deliver overall improvements. For example, there is no real value in reducing analytical laboratory lead times below the time of a release constraint test in a microbiology lab. You can however use increased velocity to help "level the load" or to maximize individual test run efficiency.

=== Make value flow and create pull ===
A lean laboratory will normally have a defined sequence of tests and associated analyst roles that make good use of people and equipment. A key principle is to flow work through the laboratory so that once testing begins on a sample, it is kept moving and not allowed to queue between tests. This creates a focus and drive to reduce throughput time, which can be converted into a lead-time reduction or used to allow samples to wait in an incoming queue to facilitate level loading and /or grouping for efficiency.

"Pull" is interpreted as testing according to customer priority. If this is not inherent in the order in which samples arrive, then the samples are taken from an incoming queue according to customer demand and thereafter processed in FIFO order with no overtaking.

=== Level the load and the mix ===
At its simplest, leveling the load (overall workload) and the mix (the mix of sample types) is about putting the same amount of work into the lab on a daily basis. This is probably the most critical step and potentially the most beneficial for the majority of testing laboratories. Successfully leveling a volatile load and mix will significantly improve productivity and/or lead time. The productivity improvement can be used to provide additional capacity or converted into a cost reduction.

=== Eliminate waste (muda) ===
Lean laboratories continuously look to develop solutions and re-engineer processes to eliminate or reduce the non-value added and incidental tasks identified when specifying value.

=== Manage performance ===
An essential part of lean in the laboratory is to manage and review a lab's performance daily, ensuring that Key Performance Indicators (KPI's) are good and that the overall laboratory process is in control.
