= Secondary sector =

Manufacturing and construction industries

In economics, the secondary sector is the economic sector which comprises manufacturing, encompassing industries that produce a finished, usable product or are involved in construction.

This sector generally takes the output of the primary sector (i.e. raw materials like metals, wood) and creates finished goods suitable for sale to domestic businesses or consumers and for export (via distribution through the tertiary sector). Many of these industries consume large quantities of energy, require factories and use machinery; they are often classified as light or heavy based on such quantities. This also produces waste materials and waste heat that may cause environmental problems or pollution (see negative externalities). Examples include textile production, car manufacturing, and handicraft.

Manufacturing is an important activity in promoting economic growth and development. Nations that export manufactured products tend to generate higher marginal GDP growth, which supports higher incomes and therefore marginal tax revenue needed to fund such government expenditures as health care and infrastructure. Among developed countries, it has historically been an important source of well-paying jobs for the middle class (e.g., engineering) to facilitate greater social mobility for successive generations.

As of 2026, the role of the secondary sector in providing mass employment has diminished in many advanced economies due to automation, robotics, and the integration of artificial intelligence (AI). While industrial output remains a significant component of GDP, the labor-intensity of the sector has decreased. In the United States, for example, employment in the secondary sector (encompassing manufacturing and construction) accounts for approximately 13% to 15% of the total labor force, down from significantly higher levels in the mid-20th century. This shift toward Industry 4.0 emphasizes highly skilled roles in system management and optimization over traditional manual labor.

The secondary sector depends on the primary sector for the raw materials necessary for production. The value added through the transformation of raw materials into finished goods reliably generates greater profitability, which underlies the growth of many developed economies.

Largest economies by industrial output (Nominal USD, Trillions) as of 2025/2026:
Economy	Industrial output (Trillions USD)
(01) China	4.66
(02) United States	2.50
(03) Japan	1.05
(04) Germany	0.84
(05) India	0.46
(06) South Korea	0.41
(07) Mexico	0.36
(08) Italy	0.35
(09) France	0.29
(10) Brazil	0.29
(11) United Kingdom	0.27
(12) Indonesia	0.25
Leading nations by manufacturing and industrial output according to 2025/2026 economic estimates. Source: World Bank and IMF.

== See also ==
- List of countries by manufacturing output
