= Value-stream-mapping software =

Type of software that helps prepare and/or analyze value stream maps

Value-stream-mapping software is a type of software that helps prepare and/or analyze value stream maps. The software typically helps design maps through utilizing a series of symbols representing activity and information/material flow, and as a supplement to manual calculations

== Details of VSM software ==
There are various types of value-stream-mapping software, these include those that can be used to simply design and construct the maps to software that can carry out calculations and perform detailed analysis. Typically, the software is available as either enhancements to already available programs or standalone products specifically designed for value-stream mapping.

== Benefits of using software ==
While value-stream maps are not overly difficult to construct, utilizing software can help speed up the process and simplify calculations that help make up a completed map. (These calculations include elements such as takt time, inventory, and value-add time). Further enhancements often include tools that can analyze the current process and facilitate future state maps (with the provision of "what if" and scenario modelling). Such tools also make it easier to engage the extended team (management, suppliers, finance, etc.) through more accurate, clearer presentation of the current state.

== Drawbacks to using software ==
Some lean practitioners claim that hand drawn maps are of more benefit describing value-stream mapping as a pencil and paper activity. Others state that the most valuable part of a value-stream-mapping activity are the maps themselves and whilst software can be used for documenting the findings it shouldn't detract from the process.

== See also ==
- Lean manufacturing
- Six sigma
