= Supply chain responsiveness matrix =

Tool that is used to analyze inventory and lead time within an organization

A supply chain responsiveness matrix is a tool that is used to analyze inventory and lead time within an organization. The matrix is one of a number of value stream mapping tools. The matrix is represented by showing lead time along the x-axis and inventory along the y-axis. The result shows where slow moving stock resides.

== See also ==
- Lean manufacturing
- Value stream mapping
