= Daniel T. Jones =

Daniel T. Jones may refer to:

- Daniel T. Jones (author), English author and researcher
- Daniel T. Jones (politician) (1800–1861), U.S. Representative from New York
