= Enterprise IT management =

Enterprise IT management (EITM) is a strategy which details how organizations can transform the management of IT to maximize business value. As a strategy for increasing the business relevance of the IT function, EITM considers the need for IT organizations to start operating as a service-based business. That is, ensuring investments are prioritized according to business strategy and that operational efficiencies can be more quickly realized and costs reduced when IT processes are integrated and automated.

Enterprise IT management was developed in response to a growing need by IT organizations to gain more value from investments made in IT capabilities, infrastructure and resources. With the vast majority of the IT budget allocated to operational overheads and IT organized along technical functions, EITM proposes a set of capabilities that enable IT to better govern, manage and secure the IT services delivered to the business. It is closely associated with Lean IT, whose focus is elimination of waste i.e. anything that does not contribute value to the customer. In this way, application of EITM tools and strategies supports chief information officers (CIOs) and chief technology officers (CTOs) in driving IT from the confines of a back-office support function to a central role in delivering customer value.

== EITM architecture and components ==
The centerpiece of the EITM architecture is a unified service model delivered through a configuration management database (CMDB) that is integrated with other IT management tools. The unified service model provides a comprehensive view or blueprint into the IT services delivered to the business. As such, it incorporates information that defines the characteristics of that service, including asset and relationship details, but also service levels, prices, costs, quality, risks and exposures. EITM promotes that only with critical insights into IT services can IT organizations truly optimize capabilities across three key areas:

IT governance – providing comprehensive service cost, quality and risk information so that the IT investment portfolio is balanced according to business strategy.

Business service management – relating detailed IT infrastructure configurations and performance metrics to business services so that operational activities are prioritized according to business impact and continuity is maintained.

Security management – associating identities and security access rights to IT services in order to mitigate business risk and meet compliance and auditing requirements.

== See also ==
- Information technology management
