= Lean thinking =

Framework aiming to provide a new way to think about how to organize human activities

Lean thinking is a business management framework made up of a philosophy, practices and principles which aim to help practitioners improve efficiency and the quality of work. Lean thinking encourages whole organisation participation. The goal is to organise human activities to deliver more benefits to society and value to individuals while eliminating waste.

== History ==
The term "lean thinking" was coined by mechanical engineer and MIT graduate student John Krafcik in 1988, who subsequently went on to run Google LLC's autonomous driving unit for many years.

== Principles ==
Lean thinking is a way of thinking about an activity and seeing the waste inadvertently generated by the way the process is organized. It uses five key principles:

- Value
- Value streams
- Flow
- Pull
- Perfection

The aim of lean thinking is to create a lean culture, one that sustains growth by aligning customer satisfaction with employee satisfaction, and that offers innovative products or services profitably while minimizing unnecessary over-costs to customers, suppliers and the environment. The basic insight of lean thinking is that if you train every person to identify wasted time and effort in their own job and to better work together to improve processes by eliminating such waste, the resulting culture (basic thinking, mindset and assumptions) will deliver more value at less expense while developing every employee's confidence, competence and ability to work with others.

== Overview ==
Lean thinking was born out of studying the rise of Toyota Motor Company from a bankrupt Japanese automaker in the early 1950s to today's dominant global player. At every stage of its expansion, Toyota remained a puzzle by capturing new markets with products deemed relatively unattractive and with systematically lower costs while not following any of the usual management dictates. In studying the company firsthand it appeared that it had a unique group of elders (sensei) and coordinators (trainers from Japan) dedicated to help managers think differently. Contrarily to every other large company, Toyota's training in its formative years was focused on developing people's reasoning abilities rather than pushing them to execute specialist-derived systems.

These sensei, or masters in lean thinking, would challenge line managers to look differently at their own jobs by focusing on:

1. The workplace: Going and seeing firsthand work conditions in practice, right now, and finding out the facts for oneself rather than relying on reports and boardroom meeting. The workplace is also where real people make real value, and going to see is a mark of respect and the opportunity to support employees to add value through their ideas and initiative more than merely make value through prescribed work. The management revolution brought by lean thinking can be summed up by describing jobs in terms of Job = Work + Kaizen
2. Value through built-in quality: Understanding that customer satisfaction is paramount and is built-in at every step of the enterprise's process, from building in satisfying features (such as peace of mind) to correctly building in quality at every production step. Built-in quality means to stop at every doubtful part and to train yourself and others not to pass on defective work, not to do defective work and not to accept defective work by stopping the process and reacting immediately whenever things go wrong.
3. Value streams through understanding "takt" time: By calculating the ratio of open production time to averaged customer demand one can have a clear idea of the capacity needed to offer a steady flow of products. This “takt” rhythm, be it a minute for cars, two months for software projects or two years for a new book leads to creating stable value streams where stable teams work on a stable set of products with stable equipment rather than optimize the use of specific machines or processes. Takt time thinking leads to completely different capacity reasoning than traditional costing and is the key to far more frugal processes.
4. Flow through reducing batch sizes: Every traditional business, whether in production or services, is addicted to batch. The idea is that once work is set up one way, we'd better get on and quickly make as many pieces of work as we can to keep the unit cost down. Lean thinking looks at this differently in trying to optimize the flow of work in order to satisfy real demand now, not imaginary demand next month. By working strenuously on reducing change-over time and difficulty, it is possible to approach the lean thinking ideal of single piece flow. In doing so, one reduces dramatically the general cost of the business by eliminating the need for warehouses, transports, systems, subcontractor use and so on.
5. Pull to visualize takt time through the flow: pulling work from upstream at takt time through visual devices such as kanban cards is the essential piece that enables lean thinkers to visualize the gaps between the ideal and the actual at the workplace at any time. Pull is what creates a creative tension in the workplace by both edging closer to single-piece-work and by highlighting problems one at a time as they occur so complex situations can be resolved piecemeal. Pull is the basic technique used to "lean" a company and, by and large, without pull there is no lean thinking.
6. Seeking perfection through kaizen: The old time sensei used to teach that the aim of lean thinking was not to apply lean tools to every process, but to develop the kaizen spirit in every employee. Perfection is not sought through better, more clever systems or go-it-alone heroes but through a commitment to improve things together step-by-small-step. Kaizen literally means change for the better and Kaizen spirit is about seeking a hundred 1% improvements from everyone every day everywhere rather than one 100% leap forward. The practice of kaizen is what anchors deep lean thinking in people's minds and which, ultimately, leads to complete transformation. Practising kaizen together builds self-confidence and the collective confidence that we can face our larger challenges and solve our problems together.

== Evolution ==
The idea of lean thinking gained popularity in the business world and has evolved in three different directions:

1. Lean thinking converts who keep seeking to understand how to seek dynamic gains rather than static efficiencies. For this group of thinkers, lean thinking continuously evolves as they seek to better understand the possibilities of the way opened up by Toyota and have grasped the fact that the aim of continuous improvement is continuous improvement. Lean thinking as such is a movement of practitioners and writers who experiment and learn in different industries and conditions, to lean think any new activity.
2. Lean production adepts who have interpreted the term "lean" as a form of operational excellence and have turned to company programs aimed at taking costs out of processes. Lean activities are used to improve processes without ever challenging the underlying thinking, with powerful low-hanging fruit results but little hope of transforming the enterprise as a whole. This "corporate lean" approach is fundamentally opposed to the ideals of lean thinking, but has been taken up by a great number of large businesses seeking to cut their costs without challenging their fundamental management assumptions.
3. Lean services, as an extent area of application to all the learnings gathered from the industry and adapted to a whole new set of scenarios, including human resources, accounting, retail, health, education, product development, startup/ entrepreneurship and digitalization. Lean basic principles can be applied basically to all scopes of action, regardless of geography and culture.

== Lean thinking practices ==
Experience shows that adopting lean thinking requires abandoning deeply engrained mainstream management thought routines, and this is never easy. The three main ways to adopt lean thinking are, unsurprisingly:

1. "Aha!" moments by seeing someone behave in a striking way, or hitting upon a new idea by reading a book, visiting a workplace, or being beaten over the head by an old time sensei. Aha! moments are powerful, but unfortunately rare, and need the right conditions to occur.
2. Everyday practice by the daily use of "lean" practices. These practices mainly originate from Toyota and are essentially "think with your hand" exercises. Their purpose is not to implement new processes (as they are too often interpreted) but practical activities to lead one to see the situation differently and have new ideas about it – to adopt a leaner way of thinking.
3. Joining lean self-study groups by practising kaizen with others and identifying which role models one would like to follow. The lean community is now a generation strong and has many great examples to offer to any lean learner, whether beginner or experienced. Workplace visits with experienced lean thinkers remain one of the most effective ways to grasp their meaning.

In the lean thinking tradition, the teacher should not explain but demonstrate – learning is the full responsibility of the learner. However, to create the proper conditions for learning the lean tradition has adopted a number of practices from Toyota's own learning curve. The aim of these practices is not to improve processes per se but to create an environment for teachable and learnable moments.

1. Kaizen activities: Whether cross-functional workshops, team quality circles, individual suggestions, and many other exercises, kaizen activities are about scheduled moments to improve the work within the normal working day. The point of kaizen is that improvement is a normal part of the job, not something to be done "when there is time left after having done everything else". Kaizen is scheduled, planned, and controlled by a teacher who makes sure Deming's plan–do–check–act is followed rigorously.
2. Kanban: Kanban is the foundational practice of lean thinking (the Toyota Production System used to be first known as the Kanban system). Any process will have different output. For instance, nowadays, a writer will produce books, keynote speeches, blog posts, tweets and answer e-mails. The question is, at the present time right now, how can the person using the process know whether they are doing what is needed for customers right now or whether they are working ahead on something not that important and lagging behind on something critical. In project management, this creates segments ahead and segments late, and end of project panic. In production, this creates entire warehouses of inventories to compensate for the inability to produce right now what is needed. Kanban is a simple technique using cards or post-it notes to visualize "leveled" (i.e. averaged to avoid peaks and troughs) activity at the process. The writer will start a new book when she's delivered one. She will worry about the new conference when it's time to. She will write a new blog post at a steady rhythm rather than publish five in a rush and then one and so on. In production, kanban cards make sure employees are working on what is needed right now and not overproducing parts which will then linger in inventory whilst others will be unavailable. Kanban is the main practice to reveal all misfits between today's activities and how the market behaves. Kanban teaches one lean thinking by constantly challenging assumptions about market behaviour and our own flexibility.
3. Autonomation: In any contemporary setting, everyone uses either machines or software to do any work. Yet, this automated work still requires specific human judgments to be done right. As a result, many machines can't be left alone to work because they're likely to go wrong if someone doesn't watch them all the time. Autonomation is the practice of progressively imparting human judgement to a system so that it self-monitors and stops and calls a human when it feels it went wrong, just as a desktop computer will flag a virus alert if it feels under attack. Autonomation is essential to separate people from machines and not have humans doing machine work and vice versa. Automation teaches lean thinking by revealing new ways of designing lighter, smarter machines with less capital expenditure.
4. Andon: Calling out when something feels out of kilter and to visualize that call on central board so that help can come quickly. Lean thinking is thinking together and no employee should be left alone with a problem. Andon is a critical system to be able to train employees in the details of their jobs within their own operations. Andon teaches lean thinking in highlighting the immediate barriers to the lean goal of zero defect at every step of the process at all time. Through andon it is possible to think better about training people and improving their work conditions to take all difficulties away.
5. SMED: Originally known as single-minute exchange of die (changing tools under 10 minutes), SMED is a key lean thinking practice to focus directly on flexibility. Flexibility is central to flow and always a problem, even for an engineer's mind – how flexible is the group to move from one topic to the next? Flexibility doesn't mean changing everything all the time, but the ability to switch quickly from one known activity to the next. SMED teaches lean thinking in always seeking to improve flexibility until one reaches true single-piece-flow in the right sequence to respond to instant customer demand.
6. Standardized work: Lean thinking is about seeking the smoothest flow in any work, in order to see problems one by one and resolve them one by one, thus improving both the flow of work and the autonomy of the person. Standardized work is the graphic description of this smooth flow of work at takt time with zero or one piece of work-in-process and clear location for everything and steps. Tricky quality points are also identified clearly, to make sure the person visualizes first, what is important for the customer, how to distinguish OK from not OK at every step and have to move confidently from one step to the next. Standardized work teaches lean thinking by visualizing every obstacle to smooth work each person encounters and highlighting topics for kaizen.
7. Visualization: Most lean thinking techniques are about visualization in some form or other so that people can see together, know together and thus learn together. Visual control is the essential trigger to creative problem solving as all can see the gap between what was planned and what actually happened and can seek both immediate countermeasures and root causes. Visualization teaches lean thinking by getting people to work together on their own problems and develop their responsibility to reaching objectives without overburden.

== Controversies ==
The use of the word "lean" is controversial due to issues arising out of the image of lean among the general public and also within the lean movement itself.

Lean has repeatedly been accused of being a form of turbo-charged Taylorism, the harbinger of productivity pressure, detrimental to employee's health and autonomy at work. Some company programs calling themselves “lean” have indeed had a severely negative effect on the business and work relations. This problem arises when senior leaders do not seek to adopt lean thinking but instead delegate to outside consultants or internal specialist team the job of “leaning” processes. Lean thinking very clearly states that it seeks cost reductions – finding the policy origins of unnecessary costs and eliminating at the cause – and not cost cutting – forcing people to work within reduced budgets and degraded conditions in order to achieve line by line cost advantage. There is no doubt about this, but to many managers, the latter option is far more expedient than the former and it's easy to call “lean” a cost-cutting program. Nonetheless, this is not that, and any approach that doesn't have the explicit aim to develop lean thinking in every employee should not be considered to be "lean".

Andrew Cox argues that some problems in supply chain management arise because of attempts to replicate Toyota's lean thinking inappropriately.

=== Putting people first ===
These controversies largely emerge around the radical organizational innovation proposed by lean thinking: putting people first rather than systems. In this, lean thinking departs markedly from mainstream management:

1. Individual customers rather than market segments: Without denying the need to think in terms of segments, lean thinking is about taking seriously every single customer complaint and opinion of the product or service, as a fact. The ability to service every customer specifically is only limited by the flexibility of the company's process and lean thinking is about seeking a way to reach the ideal of serving each individual's preferences.
2. Teaching employees how to learn rather than telling them what to do: Lean thinking's aim is to develop each person's autonomy in problem solving by supporting them in their continuous improvement activities. This is a radical break from Taylorism where a group of specialists will devise the “one-best-way” and line management will be tasked to enforce it. By contrast, lean thinking is taught to managers so that they help their own direct reports to think lean and reduce overburden, unneeded variation and activity waste by working more closely with their teams and across functional boundaries.

Lean thinking at senior level creates leaner enterprises because sales increase through customer satisfaction with higher quality products or services, because cash improve as flexibility reduces the need for inventories or backlogs, because costs reduce through identifying costly policies that create waste at value-adding level, and because capital expenditure is less needed as people themselves invent smarter, leaner processes to flow work continuously at takt time without waste.

== Lean and green ==
Lean thinking goes beyond improving business profitability. In their book Natural Capitalism, authors Paul Hawken, Amory Lovins and L. Hunter Lovins reference lean thinking as a way to sustain growth with less collateral damage to the environment. Lean thinking's approach, seeking to eliminate waste in the form of muri (overburden), mura (unlevelness) and muda (unnecessary resource use), is a proven practical way to attack complex problems piece by piece through concrete action. Toyota industrial sites are well known for their sustainability efforts and well ahead of the "zero landfill" goal – all waste recycled within the site. Practising lean thinking offers a radically new way to look at traditional goods and service production to learn how to sustain the same benefits at a lower cost, financially and environmentally.

== See also ==
- Lean enterprise
- Lean manufacturing
- Push–pull strategy
