= Lean government =

Initiative to increase government efficiency

Lean government refers to the application of Lean Manufacturing (also known as "Lean") principles and methods to both identify and then implement the most efficient, value added way to provide government services. Government agencies have found that when Lean is implemented, they see an improved understanding of how their own processes work, that it facilitates the quick identification and implementation of improvements and that it builds a culture of continuous improvement.

Lean for government focuses on governing and serving citizens with respect and continuously improving service delivery by cutting out "waste" and "inefficiency" in processes; this in turn will result in better services overall, engaged civil servants as well as more value for tax-supported programs and services. Generally, proponents also see a lean government as a mean to expand the capacity of government to provide more services per unit of investment.

== Common methods and approaches ==
Many lean manufacturing methods have been successfully adapted to identify non-value added activities (waste) in administrative, transactional, and office processes that are common in government agencies. Common Lean methods include:

- Value Stream Mapping (VSM) – Value stream mapping refers to the development of a high-level visual representation of a process flow that is involved in delivering a product or service (called a "value stream") to customers. VSM events, which are typically 3–4 days, focus on identifying the sources of non-value added activity and prioritizing possible improvement activities.
- Kaizen – Kaizen means to change for the good of all and is based on the philosophy of improvement, without regard to its size, type or duration. Kaizen activity is often focused on rapid process improvement events (called kaizen events) that bring together a cross-functional team for 3–5 days to study a specific process followed by implementing process changes.
- 5S – 5S is the name of a workplace organizational method that uses a list of five Japanese words which, when translated into English, start with the letter S—Sort, Set in Order, Shine, Standardize, and Sustain.

As more and more government services are delivered electronically, Lean government initiatives are commonly applications of Lean IT.

Lean government approaches typically have the following characteristics:

- Take a customer service perspective that seeks to optimize value delivered to the public, the regulated community, and/or other stakeholders;
- Involve employees and external stakeholders in continual improvements and problem-solving activities;
- Deploy a rapid continuous improvement framework that emphasizes implementation over prolonged planning;
- Seek to reduce the complexity of processes and the variation in process outputs;
- Use performance metrics and visual controls to provide rapid feedback to improve real-time decision-making and problem-solving; and
- Approach improvement activities using systems thinking.

Lean government does not necessarily promote low taxes, only efficient use of those taxes levied. Tax policy is discerned by the legislative and executive branches of government with oversight of the judicial branch of government. Lean government is implemented by the administrative function of government through executive order, legislative mandate, or departmental administrative decisions. Lean government can be applied in legislative, executive, and judicial branches of government.

== Types of waste ==
Several types of non-value added activity, or waste (muda in Japanese), are common in government administrative and service processes. Lean methods focus on identifying and eliminating these wastes. The list below identifies common administrative process wastes.

=== The 8 Wastes of the Administrative Process with Examples ===
The 8 wastes spell the acronym: D-O-W-N-T-I-M-E.

- Defects – Data Errors, Missing Info. Content that is out of specification requiring resources to correct.
- Overproduction – Unneeded Reports, Doing Work Not Requested. Producing too much information and overwhelming the recipient.
- Waiting – Waiting for the previous step in the process to complete.
- Non-Utilized Talent – Employees that are not effectively engaged in the process
- Transportation – Transporting items or information that is not required to perform the process from one location to another.
- Inventory – Backlog of Work, Excess Materials or information that is sitting idle (not being processed).
- Motion – People, information or equipment making unnecessary motion due to workspace layout, ergonomic issues or searching for misplaced items.
- Extra Processing – Performing any activity that is not necessary to produce a functioning document, report, or service.

Wastes in administrative and service processes can relate to:

1. collection, use, and management of information
2. design and implementation of work processes
3. the efficiency and effectiveness with which individuals work.

== Lean government activity ==
Numerous government agencies, such as the U.S. Environmental Protection Agency and the States of Arizona, Iowa, Minnesota, Missouri, and Washington, are using Lean to improve the quality, transparency and speed of government processes. As in the manufacturing and service sectors, some government agencies are implementing Lean methods in conjunction with Six Sigma process improvement approaches.

A source that lists all current vetted Lean Government initiatives at the Federal, State, City, County, and K-12 school levels is the Lean Government Center (since 2008): http://leangovcenter.com/govweb.htm

U.S. federal government

Some examples of federal government organizations with active Lean Government initiatives include:

- U.S. Environmental Protection Agency
- U.S. Department of Defense
- U.S. Army
- U.S. Department of Agriculture
- U.S. Department of Housing and Urban Development
- U.S. Nuclear Regulatory Commission

U.S. state government

Some examples of state government organizations with active Lean Government initiatives include:

- Colorado Department of Transportation (CDOT)
- Connecticut Department of Environmental Protection
- Connecticut Department of Labor
- Iowa Office of Lean Enterprise
- Minnesota Enterprise Lean
- State of Arizona, Arizona Management System
- State of Ohio Lean
- State of Missouri Operational Excellence
- Washington State's Results Washington
- New Hampshire Department of Environmental Services
- Wisconsin Department of Transportation (WisDOT)

A source that lists all current vetted Lean Government initiatives at the Federal, State, City, County, and K-12 school levels is the Lean Government Center (since 2008): http://leangovcenter.com/govweb.htm

The Environmental Council of the States (ECOS), in collaboration with the U.S. Environmental Protection Agency, works to support and coordinate information sharing among U.S. States implementing Lean Government approaches in public environmental agencies.

U.S. local government

Some examples of municipalities where lean government practices have been implemented include:

- County of Ventura, California
- City and County of Denver, Colorado
- City of Cape Coral, Florida
- City of Cincinnati, Ohio
- City of Ft. Wayne, Indiana
- City of Grand Rapids, Michigan
- City of Irving, Texas
- Jacksonville, Florida

A source that lists all current vetted Lean Government initiatives at the Federal, State, City, County, and K-12 school levels is the Lean Government Center.

The International City/County Management Association (ICMA) supports a program to assist local government organizations to improve government processes using Lean.

Canada - Saskatchewan Provincial Government

- Saskatchewan Government Think Lean Website

== See also ==
- Small government
