= Daniel T. Jones (author) =

English author and researcher

- Other name: Dan Jones
- Education: University of Sussex
- Occupations: Author, researcher
- Known for: Lean management
- Notable work: The Machine That Changed the World (1991)
- Awards: Shingo Prize for Operational Excellence (1994, 1998, 2003)

Daniel T. Jones is an English author and researcher. He won the Shingo Prize for Operational Excellence in the Research and Professional Publication category multiple times for his books The Machine that Changed the World, Lean Thinking: Banish Waste and Create Wealth in Your Organization and Seeing the Whole: Mapping the Extended Value Stream.

He is also the founder of the Lean Enterprise Academy.

== Education ==
He has a bachelor's degree in economics from the University of Sussex. In 2015 he received an honorary Doctorate of Science from the University of Buckingham in the United Kingdom.

== Works ==
Daniel Jones along with James P. Womack researched the automotive industry. Their research work with Daniel Roos, a professor at Massachusetts Institute of Technology on the automotive industry, found a three-to-one productivity difference between Japanese and American factories. Their research was published as a book, The Machine That Changed the World in 1991.

== Bibliography ==
=== Books ===
- A. Graves; Daniel T. Jones (1986). Comparison of international research and development in the automobile industry. International Motor Vehicle Program.
- Roos, Daniel, Ph.D.; Womack, James P., Ph.D.; Jones, Daniel T.: The Machine That Changed the World : The Story of Lean Production, Harper Perennial (November 1991), ISBN 0060974176, ISBN 978-0060974176
- James P. Womack; Daniel T. Jones (2002). Seeing the Whole: Mapping the Extended Value Stream, Volume 4. Taylor & Francis. ISBN 9780966784350.
- James P. Womack; Daniel T. Jones (2010). Lean Thinking: Banish Waste and Create Wealth in Your Corporation. Simon and Schuster. ISBN 9780743249270.
- James P. Womack; Daniel T. Jones (2015). Lean Solutions: How Companies and Customers Can Create Value and Wealth Together. Simon and Schuster. ISBN 9780743277792.
- Michael Balle; Daniel T. Jones (2016). Priolo, Roberto (ed.). Lead with Lean: On Lean Leadership and Practice. CreateSpace Independent Publishing Platform. ISBN 9781540480842.

== See also ==
- Lean manufacturing
