= Lean enterprise =

Practice focused on value creation for the end customer with minimal waste and processes

Lean enterprise is a practice focused on value creation for the end customer with minimal waste and processes. Principals derive from lean manufacturing and Six Sigma (or Lean Six Sigma). The lean principles were popularized by Toyota in the automobile manufacturing industry, and subsequently the electronics and internet software industries.

== Principles and variants ==
Principles for lean enterprise derive from lean manufacturing and Six Sigma principles:

There are five principles, originating from lean manufacturing, outlined by James Womack and Daniel Jones

1. Value: Understand clearly what value the customer wants for the product or service.
2. Value Stream: The entire flow of a product's or service's life cycle. In other words, from raw materials, production of the product or service, customer delivery, customer use, and final disposal.
3. Flow: Keep the value stream moving. If it's not moving, it's creating waste and less value for the customer.
4. Pull: Do not make anything until the customer orders it.
5. Perfection: Systematically and continuously remove root causes of poor quality from production processes.

There are key lean enterprise principles originating from Lean Six Sigma principles. These principles focus on eliminating 8 varieties of waste (Muda) and form the acronym Downtime:

1. Defects
2. Overproduction
3. Waiting
4. Non-Utilized Talent
5. Transportation
6. Inventory
7. Motion
8. Extra-Processing

These 8 varieties of waste are derivative from the original 7 wastes as defined in the Toyota Production System (TPS). They are:

1. Transportation
2. Inventory
3. Motion
4. Waiting
5. Overproduction
6. Over-processing
7. Defects

The 8th waste of non-utilized talent was not recognized until post-Americanization of the Toyota Production System (TPS).

The lean startup principles, developed in 2008 from lean manufacturing, also now contribute to understanding of lean enterprise:

- Eliminate wasteful practices
- Increase value producing practices
- Customer feedback during product development
- Build what customers want
- KPIs
- Continuous deployment process

== History ==
Lean enterprise is a practice focused on value creation for the end customer with minimal waste and processes. The term has historically been associated with lean manufacturing and Six Sigma (or Lean Six Sigma) due to lean principles being popularized by Toyota in the automobile manufacturing industry and subsequently the electronics and internet software industries.

=== Early 1900s: Ford, GM & Toyota Systems ===
Henry Ford developed a process called assembly line production. This is a manufacturing process in which parts are added as the assembly moves from work station to work station where parts are added in sequence until final assembly is produced.

Alfred Sloan of General Motors further developed the concept of assembly line production by building a process called mass production that allowed scale and variety. This process enabled large amounts of standardized products to run through assembly lines while still being able to produce more variety and compete against Ford's single offering.

Kiichiro Toyoda studied the Ford production system and adapted the process in order to have smaller production quantities. He built a production system called Just-in-Time Manufacturing for Toyota along with Taiichi Ohno. It's worth noting too that kaizen, the process of continuous improvement, was developed in the 1950s by Eiji Toyoda along with the Toyota Production System (TPS).

=== 1980s & 1990s: Motorola ===
New innovations in lean enterprise moved away from machine technology to electronic technology.

Another development was management techniques from Motorola commonly referred to as Six Sigma. This management technique was built off of mass production principles with more focus on minimizing variability. Applying Six Sigma principles led to reduced cycle time, reduced pollution, reduced costs, increased customer satisfaction, and increased profits.

=== 1990s & 2000s: Internet companies ===
New innovations in lean enterprise moved away from electronic manufacturing to internet and software technology. Before, during, and after the dot-com bubble, internet and software enterprises originally did not place emphasis on lean enterprise principles for efficient usage and allocation of capital and labor due to accessible funds from venture capital and capital markets. The idea of "build it and they will come" became common practice as a result.

After the dot-com bubble, inspired by the Agile Manifesto, internet and software companies began operating under agile software development practices such as Extreme programming. Along with the agile software movement, companies (especially startups) applied both lean enterprise and agile software principles together in order to develop new products or even new companies more efficiently and based on validated customer demand. Very early practices of lean enterprise and agile software principles was commonly referred to as lean startup.

After 2010, more and more enterprises are adopting this new branch of lean enterprise (lean startup) since it provides principles and methodologies for non-internet enterprises to enter in new markets or offer goods and services in new form factors with less time, labor, and capital. For internet and software enterprises (by tradition), the Lean startup variant of lean enterprise enabled them to remain competitive with new technologies and services that are rapidly coming out to market without exclusively resorting to mergers and acquisitions, and being able to retain internal innovation ecosystem competency.

== See also ==
- Lean manufacturing
- Lean Six Sigma
- Toyota Production System
- Lean startup
- Management fad
