= Work in process =

Partially finished goods

Work in process or work-in-process, WIP, work in progress, goods in process, or in-process inventory refers to a company's partially finished goods waiting for completion and eventual sale, or the value of these items. The term is used in supply chain management, and WIP is a key input for calculating inventory on a company's balance sheet. In lean thinking, inappropriate processing or excessive processing of goods or work in process, "doing more than is necessary", is seen as one of the seven wastes (Japanese term: muda) which do not add value to a product.

== WIP inventory in supply chain management ==
WIP inventory calculations can help a company assess their supply chain health and guide in supply chain planning. In most cases, it is ideal to have low WIP inventory levels, and companies that manage their inventory level efficiently tend to have lower costs. Managing WIP inventory requires coordination between several functions within a company, as well as with suppliers and customers. Higher WIP inventory levels are advantageous in that they can support a surge in demand, as well as improve cycle time since there is more material in production. However, this can also increase storage costs and obsolescence risk, as well as lead to waste if demand is lower than expected. To mitigate these risks, companies are increasingly turning to demand forecasting software. These tools analyze historical data, market trends, and customer behavior to predict future demand with greater accuracy. This allows companies to optimize WIP levels, ensuring they have enough material to meet anticipated demand without carrying excessive inventory that could become obsolete.

== WIP inventory in accounting ==
WIP inventory refers to goods that are in production and not yet a finished good. On the balance sheet, WIP inventory is aggregated into the inventory line under current assets along with raw materials and finished goods.

To calculate WIP inventory at the end of an accounting period, the following 3 figures are required: beginning WIP inventory, production costs, and finished goods. Beginning WIP inventory is the WIP inventory figure from the previous accounting period. Production costs includes all costs associated with manufacturing a product, such as raw materials, labor, and overhead costs. Finished goods is the total value of goods ready for sale in the current accounting period. The formula for calculating WIP inventory is as follows: beginning WIP inventory + production costs – finished goods.

== Tax treatment ==
In the United Kingdom, HMRC has no specific definition of work-in-process, but three different types of uncompleted items are identified for tax purposes:

- manufactured products
- contracts for services
- construction contracts
