= Leane =

Leane may refer to:

== People ==
=== Surname ===
- Lionel Leane (fl. 1940s), detective on South Australia's Tamam Shud case
- Pat Leane (1930–2018), Australian Olympic track and field athlete
- Raymond Leane (1878–1962), Australian Army officer and police commissioner
- Shaun Leane (born 1963), Australia politician
- Shaun Leane (jeweller) (born 1969), British jewellery designer

=== Given Name ===
- Léane Labrèche-Dor (born 1988), Canadian actress
- Marion Leane Smith (1891–1957), Aboriginal Australian-Canadian nurse in WWI
- Leane Suniar (1948–2021), Indonesian Olympic archer
- Leane Zugsmith (1903–1969), American writer

== Other uses ==
- Lough Leane, a lake in Killarney, Ireland

== See also ==
- Lean (disambiguation)
- Leaney, a surname
