= Quality filter mapping =

Part of the Value Stream Mapping toolkit

Quality filter mapping is part of the value stream mapping toolkit and is used to analyse processes/functions with respect to quality. The results of a quality filter map shows how much waste is being generated within an organisation at each stage of the process.

Three types of quality are measured as part of the model:

1. Product quality: Defective item provided to customer
2. Defect quality: Defective item found prior to receipt by customer
3. Service quality: Defects that affect the ability of the supplier to provide the service or product to the customer

Quality failures/defects are represented as a ratio (typically parts per million). Results of quality filter mapping are commonly used to feed into continuous improvement plans.

A revised map is then generated after implementation of improvement plans to measure the result of improvements.
