= Cycle time =

Measure of software development speed

Cycle time measures how long it takes to process a given job - whether it's a client request, an order, or a defined production process stage. The Project Management Institute's Project Management Body of Knowledge's 7 edition defines cycle time as "the total elapsed time from the start of a particular activity or work item to its completion."

== See also ==
- Lead time
- Throughput (business)
- Takt time
