= Leen (given name) =

Origin
- Origin: Multiple
- Meaning: Arabic meaning “tender, delicate” or a Dutch short form of Heleene or a Dutch short form of Leendert

Other names
- Related names: لِينٌ, Heleene, Leane, Leendert, Leene, Lein, Leine, Len, Lene, Leyn, Leyne, Lian, Lin, Line, Liyne, Lyn, Lyne.

Leen is a name of multiple origins. It is a popular Arabic name for girls meaning “tender” and “delicate”. It is spelled لِينٌ in Arabic and has been translated into English in multiple spellings.

It can also be a unisex given name of Dutch origin. As a name for girls, it can be a Dutch short form of the name Heleen. As a masculine name, it can be a Dutch short form of Leendert.

People with the name include:

- Leen Barth (born 1952), Dutch former footballer
- Leen Buis (1906–1986), Dutch road cyclist
- Leen Jansen (1930–2014), Dutch boxer
- Leen Korpershoek (1904–1989), Dutch swimmer
- Leen Looijen (1947), Dutch football manager
- Leen Quist (1942–2014), Dutch ceramist
- Leen van der Waal (1928–2020), Dutch engineer and former politician

== See also ==
- Leen (surname)
