= Lean higher education =

Lean Higher Education (LHE) refers to the adaptation of lean thinking to higher education, typically with the goal of improving the efficiency and effectiveness of operations. Lean, originally developed at the Toyota Motor Corporation, is a management philosophy that emphasizes "respect for people" and "continuous improvement" as core tenets. Lean encourages employees at all organizational levels to re-imagine services from a customer's point of view, removing process steps that do not add value and emphasizing steps that add the most value. While the concept of "customers" and "products" is controversial in higher education settings, there are certainly diverse stakeholders who are interested in the success of colleges and universities, the most common of which are students, faculty, administrators, potential employers and various levels of government.

Lean in higher education has been applied both to administrative and academic services. Balzer (2010) described such initiatives within university settings, including the critical factors for success and ways to measure progress. He noted that LHE can be effective to respond to higher education's heightened expectations, reducing expenses in an era of rising costs, meeting demands of public accountability, and leveraging institutional resources to fulfill the educational, scholarship, and outreach missions of higher education. A comprehensive literature review examining Lean's impact on higher education has been published. The authors reported that Lean has a significant and measurable impact when used to improve academic and administrative operations. Such improvements are effective at the department/unit level or throughout an entire institution. However, the authors noted that implementing Lean is a serious undertaking that is most impactful if it involves long-term, strategic planning.

Though the application of Lean management in higher education is more prevalent in administrative processes (e.g., admissions, registration, HR, and procurement) it also has been applied to academic processes (e.g., course design and teaching, improving degree programs, student feedback, and handling of assignments) in an increasing number of cases.

Pioneering academic institutions who have implemented Lean include: Cardiff University (Wales), Edinburgh Napier University (Scotland), Michigan Technological University (USA), Rensselaer Polytechnic Institute (USA), University of Aberdeen (Scotland), University of Central Oklahoma (USA), University of St. Andrews (Scotland), Winona State University (USA) and others. A group of universities in the U.K. formed the LeanHEHub in 2012/2013. In 2016 the network was restructured due to growth, and is now known as Lean HE - the Lean in Higher Education Network. The Lean HE network has three continental divisions (Lean HE Americas, Lean HE Europe and Lean HE AsiaPacific). In Scotland, the Scottish Higher Education Improvement Network (SHEIN) is a collaborative network of HE professionals working within the area of continuous improvement. SHEIN exists to encourage the sharing of resources and best practice, online and face-to-face. In 2020 SHEIN became Lean HE Scotland, a sub-group of Lean HE Europe.

== Lean Principles ==
Of great importance in the application of Lean management in any organization is the recognition and daily practice of the Lean principles: "Continuous Improvement" and "Respect for People." The "Respect for People" principle is challenging for management to implement, because most managers have risen to their level of responsibility based on their superior "fire-fighting" skills. With Lean, managers are coaches who guide their employees through a problem solving process. The employee learns how to ask themselves the questions that enable them to solve problems on their own, with the same or better quality that the manager would have achieved. Problems occur when managers cannot relinquish control, resulting in zero-sum (win-lose) outcomes for people and inferior results. In other words, one party gains at another party's expense, and the losers are much less willing to participate in continuous improvement. This outcome impedes teamwork and information flows, and discourages daily efforts by administration, faculty, and staff to improve processes. In order to function properly, Lean management must be understood and practiced in a plus-sum (win-win) manner. The "Respect for People" principle is required in order to sustain continuous improvement .

== Lean Practices ==
The origins of Lean practices date from late 19th- and early 20th-century industrial engineering. Lean practices have evolved over the decades since then to become much easier for non-specialists to understand and use. It is now common for people with backgrounds and interests far from industrial engineering to become highly competent Lean management practitioners. Therefore, the Lean management system has the benefit that everyone in an organization can apply the practices without the need for specialists.

Seminal work in the application of Lean to academic processes was done by Prof. M.L. "Bob" Emiliani when he was at Rensselaer Polytechnic University in the early 2000s and is described in two papers: M.L. "Bob" Emiliani (2004) "Improving Business School Courses by Applying Lean Principles and Practices," and M.L. "Bob" Emiliani (2005) "Using Kaizen to Improve Graduate Business School Degree Programs,". The former paper describes what individual faculty can do to improve their courses and delivery using Lean principles and practices. The latter paper describes what teams of faculty, staff, administrators, students, alumni, and employers can do to improve their courses using kaizen (literal translation: "change for the better"). Prof. Emiliani also produced a Kaizen Team Leader's Manual for improving academic courses and programs based on his work.

The use of Lean practices in academic processes are described in two papers written by Prof. Emiliani cited above (Refs. 2,3), and in the book Lean Higher Education: Increasing the Value and Performance of University Processes.

== Differences Between Lean in Higher Education and Lean in Other Sectors ==
Lean in HE follows the same principles and practices of Lean management as applied in service, manufacturing, or government sectors. Lean management readily takes into account the unique governance structures of higher education institutions. Lean management is responsive to the needs of multiple stakeholders in a non-zero-sum fashion and is therefore well-suited for the governance and ongoing improvement of HEIs.

The business of teaching in, or the back office administration of, Higher Education Institutions (HEI's) is similar to Lean management practiced in other service sectors because teaching and administration consist of repeatable transactional processes, in whole or part. Guidance for Lean implementation in HE administration, and, to a lesser extent in teaching, is presented in the book Lean Higher Education, Increasing the Value and Performance of University Processes.

== Impact of Lean in Higher Education ==
The impact of Lean in HE (namely in academic activities), have been studied and found to be potentially beneficial. The benefits include lead-time reduction, increase in throughput, lower cost, increased student satisfaction scores, etc. Reports analyzing Lean in higher education indicate that Lean principles are being successfully applied. Various HE stakeholders will likely perceive their organization to be substantially different or possess unique characteristics compared to other service organizations or businesses using Lean management. These reports, as well as a wide range of empirical results, show such perceptions to be erroneous.

== Criticisms of Lean Management ==
The principal criticisms of Lean management are well known, relatively few in number, and have been constant over time. Workers may view Lean management as undesirable if it is incorrectly implemented, because it could make them work harder, they might have less time to spend with customers, and, ultimately, they could lose their jobs. These criticisms, which will surely be voiced by faculty and staff in HE, are predictable and the result of zero-sum (win-lose) application of Lean management by senior managers.

Supporters of Lean might assert that Lean management can be conducted in a non-zero-sum (win-win) manner—the criticism is simply a result of misapplication of the central concepts.
