= Eric Lean =

Taiwanese electrical engineer (born 1938)

Eric Gung-Hwa Lean
- 林耕華
- Born: 11 January 1938 (age 88); Taiwan
- Education: National Cheng Kung University (B.S.); University of Washington (M.S.); Stanford University (Ph.D.)
- Known for: Optoelectronics research
- Scientific career
- Fields: Optoelectronics
- Workplaces: Thomas J. Watson Research Center; Industrial Technology Research Institute

Eric Gung-Hwa Lean (Chinese: 林耕華; born 11 January 1938) is a Taiwanese electrical engineer specializing in optoelectronics.

== Education and career ==
Lean graduated from National Cheng Kung University in 1959 with a bachelor's of science degree in electrical engineering, and furthered his education in the subject at the University of Washington, where he earned a master's degree in 1963, followed by a doctorate in the same field at Stanford University in 1967. After completing his Ph.D., Lin worked at the Thomas J. Watson Research Center until 1992. During the 1980s, Lean was recruited by Pan Wen-Yuan to contribute his expertise in optoelectronics to the Industrial Technology Research Institute (ITRI). Lean formally joined the ITRI in 1992 as director of its Institute of Optoelectronics, and retired in 2000.

Lean was elected a fellow of the Optical Society of America in 1990, to an equivalent honor by the Institute of Electrical and Electronics Engineers in 1997, and elected to academician status in Taiwan's Academia Sinica in 1998.
