= Willie Joe Leen =

Irish hurler

Personal information
- Born: County Kerry, Ireland

Sport
- Sport: Hurling
- Position: Half back\Medfield
Club
- Years: Club
- 1990s-present: Ballyheigue
Club titles
- Kerry titles: 3
Inter-county
- Years: County
- 1990s-2000s: Kerry
Inter-county titles
- Munster titles: 0
- All-Irelands: 0
- NHL: 1 (Div 2)
- All Stars: 0

Willie Joe Leen is a former hurler from Ballyheigue, County Kerry. He played with the Ballyheigue county championship winning teams of 1996,1997, and 2000. He also played with the Kerry intercounty team win a National League Div 2 medal in 2001.
