= Hooi Hooi Lean =

Malaysian economist

Dr. Hooi Hooi Lean
- Born: Penang, Malaysia
- Occupations: Professor, Economist

Academic background
- Education: National University Singapore Universiti Sains Malaysia University of Malaya

Academic work
- Discipline: Economics
- Sub-discipline: Risk Analysis, Applied Statistics and Econometrics, Asia-Pacific and China Economics, Energy Economics, Finance and Stock Market
- Institutions: Universiti Sains Malaysia

Hooi Hooi Lean is a Malaysian economist and a professor at the School of Social Sciences in the Economics program at University of Science, Malaysia. Lean acts as an associate editor of Singapore Economic Review, Capital Market Review and Frontiers in Energy and an editor of J. of Asian Finance, Economics and Business and East Asian J. of Business Management.

== Early life and work ==
Hooi Hooi Lean was born and raised in Penang, Malaysia. She graduated from the University of Malaya with a Bachelor of Economics in Statistics and obtained her Master of Science in statistics from Universiti Sains Malaysia. She attained her Ph.D. in economics from the National University of Singapore and served as a post-doctoral visiting scholar at Monash University, Australia's Department of Economics. Additionally, Lean has been a visiting scholar at SungKyunKwan University in South Korea, Tamkang University in Taiwan, CEREFIGE Universitè Nancy 2 in France, and Auckland University of Technology in New Zealand.

== Select publications ==
- Wei Kiong Ting, Irene; Hooi Lean, Hooi (2009-10-16). "Intellectual capital performance of financial institutions in Malaysia". Journal of Intellectual Capital. 10 (4): 588–599. doi:10.1108/14691930910996661. ISSN 1469-1930.
- Lean, Hooi Hooi; Smyth, Russell (2010-06-01). "CO2 emissions, electricity consumption and output in ASEAN". Applied Energy. 87 (6): 1858–1864. doi:10.1016/j.apenergy.2010.02.003. ISSN 0306-2619.
- Shahbaz, Muhammad; Lean, Hooi Hooi (2012-01-01). "Does financial development increase energy consumption? The role of industrialization and urbanization in Tunisia". Energy Policy. Strategic Choices for Renewable Energy Investment. 40: 473–479. doi:10.1016/j.enpol.2011.10.050. ISSN 0301-4215.
- Badeeb, Ramez Abubakr; Lean, Hooi Hooi; Clark, Jeremy (2017-03-01). "The evolution of the natural resource curse thesis: A critical literature survey" (PDF). Resources Policy. 51: 123–134. Bibcode:2017RePol..51..123B. doi:10.1016/j.resourpol.2016.10.015. ISSN 0301-4207.
