= Failure demand =

Systems theory concept

Failure demand, also known as avoidable contact, is demand on a service organisation caused by the organisation's failure to do something, or to do something right, for a customer. It is distinguished from value demand - normal requests for whatever service the organisation exists to provide. The term "failure demand" was coined by British occupational psychologist John Seddon.

The concept is widely applied in the UK public sector, and was adopted in 2008 by the UK Cabinet Office as one of 198 "national indicators" of local authority performance. It is sometimes claimed that up to 80% of demand on public services is failure demand.

Some UK police forces have worked with academics to assess their failure demand. A service redesign resulting from such a study with Cheshire Constabulary is credited with "doubling the number of urgent incidents they could attend in the appropriate time". A study of Gloucestershire Constabulary found repeat or failure demand in 32% of incidents. Examples of failure demand included repeat reports of an unresolved problem, calls to chase up police who had not yet attended a scene, and calls made to the control room to contact a specific officer for whom a crime victim had not been provided with contact details.

Academic studies and mainstream media reporting in the UK have both highlighted the role of failure demand in the NHS. A 2017 study found that "primary care systems often generate failure demand" which is then "deflected to other systems, such as the accident and emergency department", to the detriment of patients. Reporting in The Guardian in 2003 similarly suggested that hospitals bear the cost of failure demand from other parts of the NHS, claiming that around a third of all hospital bed occupancy is a result of failure demand, and that failures elsewhere leave medically stable patients in hospital beds inappropriately. After the Autumn Budget of 2024, an article in the New Statesman characterised the NHS as "beset" by failure demand and criticised the budget for funding additional hospital appointments without providing a similar increase in resources to primary care, from which much failure demand originates.

However, studies of failure demand in healthcare have also questioned the practical applicability of the concept. The aforementioned 2017 study of failure demand in the NHS, despite noting failure demand's important role in system, found there were difficulties recording it; the same study suggested that failure demand analysis has had "limited success in the public sector" due to the inability of managers to enact systemic change based on the results of their analyses. Another study, from South Africa, found that usual definitions of "failure demand" were inadequate to describe healthcare systems as some demand fell outside the "value demand"/"failure demand" binary.
