= Jack Lean =

Australian rules footballer

Personal information
- Full name: John Henry Lean
- Born: 15 September 1899; Whorouly, Victoria
- Died: 23 December 1965 (aged 66); Burwood, Victoria

Playing career^{1}
Years	Club	Games (Goals)
1927–28	Fitzroy	6 (5)
- ^{1} Playing statistics correct to the end of 1928.

John Henry Lean (15 September 1899 – 23 December 1965) was an Australian rules footballer who played with Fitzroy in the Victorian Football League (VFL).
