= Program on Vehicle and Mobility Innovation =

International research consortium

The Program on Vehicle and Mobility Innovation (PVMI) is the oldest and largest international research consortium aimed at analyzing the global automotive industry.

== History ==
PVMI, founded as the International Motor Vehicle Program (IMVP) at the Massachusetts Institute of Technology in 1979, has mapped lean methodologies, established benchmarking standards, and probed the automotive value chain. The program's data-driven methods set the standard for industry research. In 2013, program was restructured and renamed as part of its incorporation into the Mack Institute for Innovation Management at the Wharton School.

PVMI/IMVP has had a major impact on the global automobile industry and the economy that surrounds it since it was launched in 1979. More than 50 senior scientists, management experts, social scientists, and engineers have conducted interdisciplinary automotive research at more than 25 universities on six continents.

The program has gone through several phases since its conception in 1980:

- Phase One (1979–1990) During this first phase, IMVP is best known for developing the name “lean production” to characterize the new paradigm that challenged mass production starting in the 1970s and 1980s, documented in the landmark book The Machine that Changed the World.
- Phase Two (1990–1998) IMVP tracked the diffusion of lean production. Researchers examined barriers to the adoption of “lean” and renewed efforts by mass production-oriented firms to innovate. The program's longitudinal benchmarking projects tracked the worldwide convergence in performance in manufacturing productivity and quality.
- Phase Three (1998-2013) IMVP continued tracking disruptive changes in the auto industry, including massive reductions in vertical integration, increases in outsourcing, experiments with modularity, and the influx of new technologies. A significant publication during this time was the book Clockspeed: Winning Industry Control in the Age of Temporary Advantage.
- Phase Four (2013–Present) This phase marks the transition from IMVP to PVMI and the program's integration into the Mack Institute for Innovation Management at the Wharton School. Ongoing research focuses on disruptive technologies and new business models affecting the evolving global automotive industry and the broader mobility domain. A significant project is an electric vehicle forecasting challenge in cooperation with the Good Judgment Project, based on the work of Philip E. Tetlock and Barbara Mellers.

== Key publications ==
- Womack, James P., Jones, Daniel T., and Roos, Daniel (1990), The Machine That Changed the World: The Story of Lean Production, Rawson Associates
- Clark, Kim and Fujimoto, Takahiro (1991) Product Development Performance, Harvard Business School Press
- Kochan, Thomas A, Lansbury, Russell D., and Macduffie, John Paul (1997) After Lean Production: Evolving Employment Practices in the World Auto Industry, Cornell University Press
- Fine, Charles H. (1998): Clockspeed : winning industry control in the age of temporary advantage, New York, NY: Basic Books. - ISBN 0-7382-0153-7.
- Cusumano, Michael and Nobeoka, Kentaro (1998) Thinking Beyond Lean: How Multi Project Management is transforming Product Development at Toyota and other Companies, The Free Press
- Fujimoto, Takahiro (1999) The Evolution of a Production System at Toyota, Oxford University Press
- Holweg, Matthias and Pil, Frits K. (2004) The Second Century : Reconnecting Customer and Value Chain through Build-to-Order, MIT Press
