= John Krafcik =

Waymo CEO (2015-2021)

John F. Krafcik
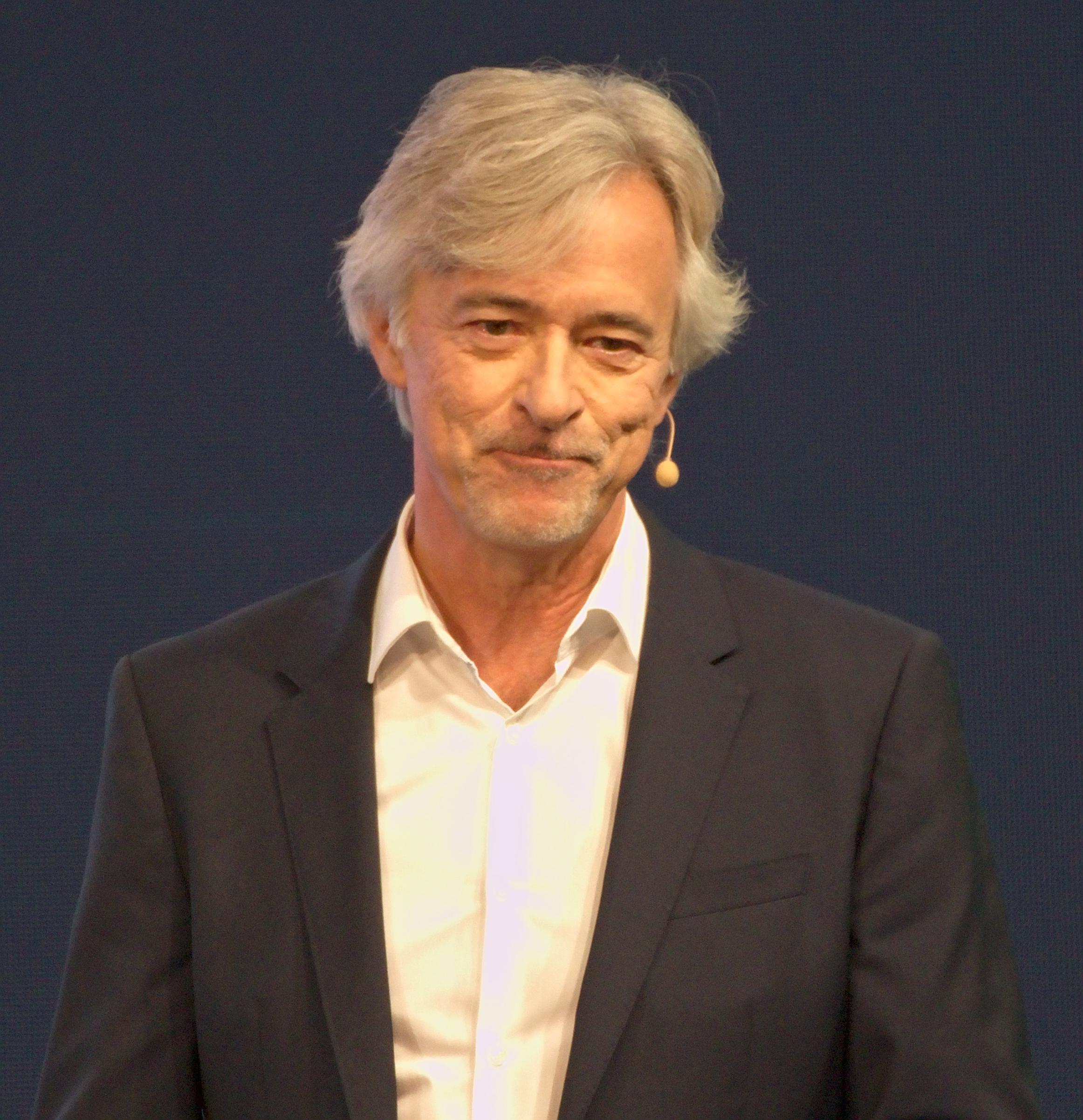
- Krafcik in 2019
- Born: September 18, 1961 (age 65); Southington, Connecticut
- Education: Stanford University; MIT Sloan School of Management
- Occupation: Rivian board member

John F. Krafcik (born September 18, 1961) is a member of the board of directors at electric vehicle manufacturer Rivian.

He was the CEO of Waymo from 2015 to 2021. Krafcik was the former president of TrueCar and president and CEO of Hyundai Motor America. He was named CEO of Google's self-driving car project in September 2015. Krafcik remained CEO after Google separated its self-driving car project and transitioned it into a new company called Waymo, housed under Google's parent company Alphabet Inc.

== Early life and education ==
Krafcik grew up in Southington, Connecticut. He studied mechanical engineering at Stanford University, where he graduated in 1983. He received his master's degree in management from Massachusetts Institute of Technology in 1988, where he studied under James P. Womack.

== Career ==
Krafcik worked in traditional automotive manufacturing for several decades before moving to Google's self-driving car project in 2015. His first job was at New United Motor Manufacturing, Inc., a joint venture between General Motors and Toyota, as a quality and manufacturing engineer from 1984 to 1986. He worked in the International Motor Vehicle Program at MIT as a lean production researcher and consultant from 1986 to 1990. During this time, Krafcik traveled and studied 90 manufacturing plants in 20 countries, comparing their productivity and quality. His studies formed the data behind Womack's book, The Machine That Changed the World. The book was a study on "lean production", a term Krafcik coined. In 1990, Krafcik moved to Ford Motor Company where he held several positions, including chief engineer for the Ford Expedition and Lincoln Navigator in the late 1990s and early 2000s and the chief engineer for truck chassis engineering.

Krafcik started at Hyundai Motor America as vice president for product development and strategic planning in 2004. Within a few years he was promoted to become the president and CEO of Hyundai Motor America until the end of 2013. During Krafcik's tenure, Hyundai reported record sales and increased U.S. market share. Following the 2008 financial crisis, Krafcik oversaw a group at Hyundai to create an "Assurance Program". The program allowed Americans to return their new cars if they lost their jobs within a year.

Krafcik moved to become president of True Car, Inc. in 2014 and served as a director of the company's board.

Google hired Krafcik to head its self-driving cars unit in September 2015, as the company struggled to build relationships in the Motor City.

In 2018, Krafcik was awarded Smithsonian Magazine's American Ingenuity Award for Technology alongside Dmitri Dolgov.

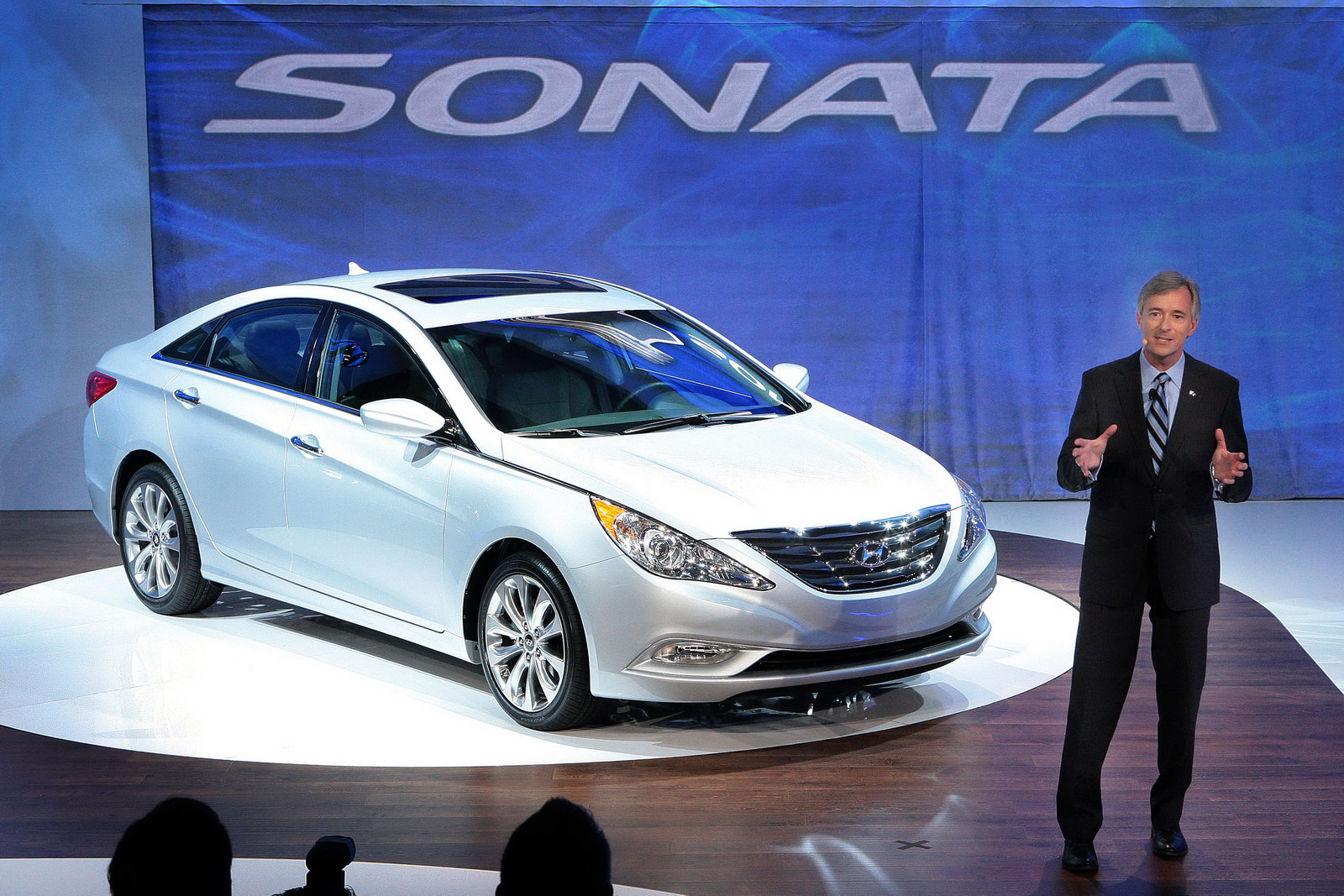
John Krafcik presenting the Hyundai Sonata

=== Waymo ===
In December 2016, more than a year after Krafcik joined Google, the company's self-driving car project was spun off as its own company, Waymo, a subsidiary of Google parent Alphabet, and Krafcik became its CEO. In 2017 and 2018, under Krafcik, Waymo struck partnerships with Lyft, Fiat Chrysler, and Jaguar Land Rover. Krafcik initiated talks with Fiat Chrysler CEO Sergio Marchionne. Two months later, the two announced a deal to integrate Waymo hardware into Fiat Chrysler minivans. Krafcik also made a deal with Avis Budget Group to maintain its growing fleet.

As CEO, Krafcik led Waymo's efforts to commercialize the company's autonomous technology. These include ride sharing, trucking, urban last-mile solutions and passenger cars. Krafcik also pursued licensing Waymo's technology to vehicle manufacturers and has deployed the largest fleet of self-driving cars. Krafcik told auto makers that Waymo's goal is to make better drivers, not cars.

In April 2021, Krafcik resigned as Waymo CEO to "kick-off new adventures".
