= The Machine That Changed the World (book) =

Book on automobile production (1990)

The Machine That Changed the World is a 1990 book about automobile production, written by James P. Womack, Daniel T. Jones, Daniel Roos and Donna Sammons Carpenter.

It is the result of five-years research by the International Motor Vehicle Program (IMVP) at Massachusetts Institute of Technology (MIT), aimed at finding success factors in the global automobile industry. The book traces the history of "craft" and "mass" production methods, and notes how Toyota found flaws and wastage with these systems, eventually developing lean production. The dissemination of lean methods from Japan to the wider world is discussed.

This book made the term lean production known worldwide, and is described as a classic or a "mainstay". Business Week described it as "the most readable book on the changes reshaping manufacturing".

A revised edition was published in 2007.

== Summary ==
Beginning in the earliest times of car production, the book describes and analyzes craft production from Europe. It then moves on to mass production, with Ford's factory production of cars being fast and valuable. The book dives into how and why mass production did and didn't work.

Near the middle of the book, a focus on the automobile industry in Japan, and goes into detail about Sakichi Toyoda's formation of a unique business model involving connecting 3 or more tiers of production to streamline production. The "lower" tiers involved producers, primarily the part makers, which would make or buy the parts to send to the next tier. The smaller parts would be combined into larger portions of the car, and then the final tier would put everything together.

The book describes that the system of interconnected "subbusinesses" were so successful because they communicated.

The automobile industry in most other places in the world were much more competitive at the time, and manufacturers were distrusting of parts producers and vice versa. Any time a car manufacturer wanted a part producer partnership, they took bids and chose the "cheapest" offer, which very likely wasn't a sustainable price, and the engineers of the cars weren't able to properly communicate with the parts producers.

In the system that Toyoda and Taiichi Ohno developed, a "family" of businesses that held stock in each other all worked together to source, make, and assemble parts for their products. The book goes into detail about all the benefits of the increased communicating and transparency between the producers and manufacturer.

In the remaining 4 chapters (out of 10) the book elaborates on other ways the Lean mindset reduced inefficiencies, shows data from automobile manufacturers around the world, and finishes off by describing the "perfect" Lean methodology/company.

Be warned, this book goes into most detail about the 1960s to late 1970s, and the 2007 revision didn't add any more recent data, so it does not account for modern-day automobile production or the changes that have happened since the 1900's.

== See also ==
- Lean manufacturing
- Automotive engineering

== Bibliography ==
- Roos, Daniel; Womack, James P.; Jones, Daniel T.: The Machine That Changed the World: The Story of Lean Production, Harper Perennial (November 1990), ISBN 0060974176, ISBN 978-0060974176
