= Finished goods =

Item that has been manufactured but not sold

In business and accounting, finished goods are goods that have completed the manufacturing process but have not yet been sold or distributed to the end user.

== Manufacturing ==
Manufacturing has three classes of inventory:

1. Raw material
2. Work in process
3. Finished goods

A good purchased as a "raw material" goes into the manufacture of a product. A good only partially completed during the manufacturing process is called "work in process". When the good is completed as to manufacturing but not yet sold or distributed to the end-user, it is called a "finished good".

This is the last stage for the processing of goods. The goods are ready to be consumed or distributed. There is no processing required in term of the goods after this stage by the seller, although in many cases, a seller's finished goods become a buyer's input materials: for example, a company which makes packaging will see their completed packaging as finished goods but other companies will use the packaging within its own material operations.

Finished goods is a relative term. In a supply chain management flow, the finished goods of a supplier can constitute the raw material of a buyer.

== See also ==
- Final good
