= Daniel Roos =

American engineer

Daniel Roos is an American engineer, focusing on the technology and policy of transportation systems, and currently the Japan Steel Industry Professor of Civil and Environmental Engineering and Engineering Systems Emeritus at Massachusetts Institute of Technology.
