= John Seddon =

British occupational psychologist

John Seddon is a British occupational psychologist and author specializing in organizational change within the service industry. He is the founder and managing director of Vanguard, a consultancy firm established in 1985. He is also a visiting professor at Buckingham University Business School.

Seddon's prominence grew following attacks on current British management thinking. These included the belief in economies of scale, quality standards such as ISO9000 and much of public sector reform including "deliverology", the use of targets, inspection and centralized control of local services. The Daily Telegraph described him as a "reluctant management guru", with a background in occupational psychology.

He is critical of target-based management, and of basing decisions on economies of scale, rather than "economies of flow".

Seddon has published seven books. In his 2008 book, Systems Thinking in the Public Sector, he criticized the UK Government reform programme. He advocated its replacement by systems thinking. His book, The Whitehall Effect, was published on 5 November 2014. In it he articulates a more productive role for government in public-sector reform. His latest book, Beyond Command and Control, was published on 30 September 2019 and promises to expose the inherent fallacies contained within command and control management.

Seddon won the first Management Innovation Prize for 'Reinventing Leadership' in October 2010.

== Education ==
John Seddon earned a BSc (Hons) in Psychology with the University of Wales in 1974 and graduated with a MSc in occupational psychology from the University of London in 1977.

== Debate about local government management ==
An opinion piece on the detrimental effects of inspection regimes prompted discussion on the Local Government Chronicle (LGC) website with David Walker, Managing Director, Communications & Reporting, at the Audit Commission.

The debate was also covered in newspapers including The Times, which featured it on 31 July 2009.

== Campaign ==
Seddon wrote an open letter dated 31 January 2011 calling for the Rt. Hon Iain Duncan Smith and Lord Freud, the ministers responsible for Welfare Reform, to "halt the current programme of reorganization associated with the Single Universal Credit and embark on a better course". In the letter, he wrote: "This campaign is not about the concept of the Single Universal Credit as such. It is about the design and implementation of its delivery". He says the weakness in the proposals for online and call center delivery of the new Single Universal Credit is the "continuing unquestioning faith in economies of scale". In August 2011, a petition was started on the Government e-petitions site as part of the campaign. The petition calls for Iain Duncan Smith to rethink the centralized IT-dominated service design of Universal Credit.
