= James P. Womack =

American writer

James P. Womack was the research director of the International Motor Vehicle Program (IMVP) at the Massachusetts Institute of Technology (MIT) in Cambridge, Massachusetts and is the founder and chairman of the Lean Enterprise Institute, a nonprofit institution for the dissemination and exploration of the Lean thinking with the aim of his further development of the Lean Enterprise.

== Life and work ==
Womack first became widely known as an author in 1990 with publication of the book The Machine That Changed the World, which made the term lean production known worldwide. The book has been translated into eleven languages and has been sold more than 600,000 times. A revised edition was published in 2007.

Womack received his bachelor's degree in political science from the University of Chicago in 1970. He earned his master's degree in transportation systems in 1975 at Harvard University. His Ph.D in political science was received from the Massachusetts Institute of Technology (MIT) in 1982 for a dissertation on the comparison of industrial policy in the United States, Germany and Japan.

From 1975-1991 Womack led a number of comparative studies on worldwide production practices. The study of the automotive industry (the International Motor Vehicle Program - IMVP), funded with more than US$5 million, was the most important. Womack left MIT shortly after the publication of his book and founded the Lean Enterprise Institute (LEI) in 1997.

In addition, he also founded the Lean Global Network (LGN) together with Dr. Bodo Wiegand and José Ferro, which combines the interests and objectives of the Lean Management Community. The umbrella organization wants to ensure uniform standards when implementing learning concepts and to encourage the exchange among its members.

He is married and has two daughters.

== Works ==
- Lean Solutions: How Companies and Customers Can Create Value and Wealth Together ISBN 978-3-593-38112-1
- Lean Thinking: Banish Waste and Create Wealth in Your Corporation ISBN 3-593-37561-3
- The Machine That Changed the World: The Story of Lean Production ISBN 0060974176, ISBN 978-0060974176
