= Lean manufacturing =

Methodology used to improve production

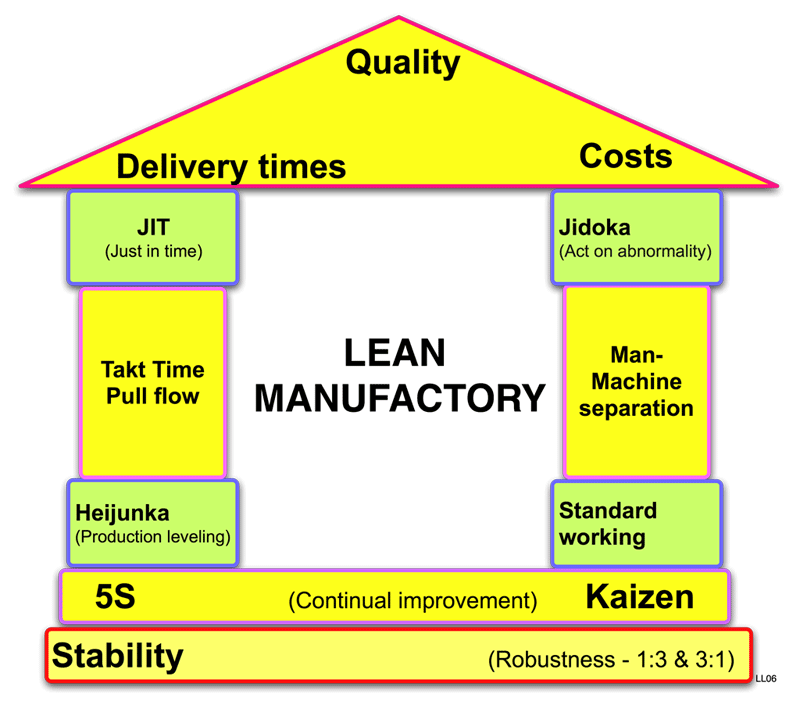
Lean manufactory house

Lean manufacturing is a management system built on three principles:

- produce only what is needed, when it is needed;
- correct abnormalities as soon as they occur; and
- empower workers to improve the process themselves.

At its core, Lean eliminates activities that do not add value for the customer. Where just-in-time (JIT) manufacturing focuses on inventory strategy — receiving goods only as needed to reduce costs and waste — Lean goes further by reducing cycle time, flow time, and throughput time across the entire system, including marketing and customer service. According to one study: "While Just-In-Time manufacturing focuses on efficiency of inventory strategy to eliminate waste and enhance productivity, Lean manufacturing uses efficiency in its system setups to reduce cycle, flow, and throughput times being the added values to customers."

By receiving goods only when needed, Lean reduces inventory costs and wastage, while increasing productivity and profit. A successful operation depends on producers having fast and high-quality processes that can generate on-demand, result of involving workers bottom-up.

== Origins ==
=== Early foundations ===
Frederick Winslow Taylor documented manufacturing efficiencies in Principles of Scientific Management (1911), and Henry Ford applied these ideas in the early 1900s. However, these methods addressed physical organization only, not management systems or culture.

Before World War II, American statistician W. Edwards Deming and Walter A. Shewhart developed the earliest formalized modern manufacturing philosophies, applying statistical models to improve efficiency in large U.S. military manufacturers during the war. American industry largely rejected their methods at the time.

Continuous production improvement and incentives for such were documented in Taylor's Principles of Scientific Management (1911):

- "... whenever a workman proposes an improvement, it should be the policy of the management to make a careful analysis of the new method, and if necessary conduct a series of experiments to determine accurately the relative merit of the new suggestion and of the old standard. And whenever the new method is found to be markedly superior to the old, it should be adopted as the standard for the whole establishment."
- "...after a workman has had the price per piece of the work he is doing lowered two or three times as a result of his having worked harder and increased his output, he is likely entirely to lose sight of his employer's side of the case and become imbued with a grim determination to have no more cuts if soldiering [marking time, just doing what he is told] can prevent it."

Shigeo Shingo cites reading Principles of Scientific Management in 1931 and being "greatly impressed to make the study and practice of scientific management his life's work".

=== Post-war Japan ===
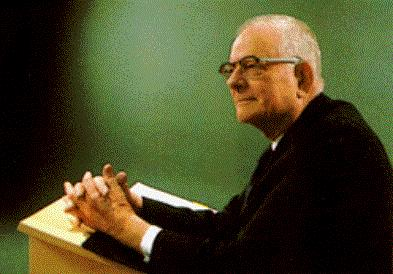
W. Edwards Deming

After the war, Deming was assigned by General Douglas MacArthur to assist in Japan's reconstruction. Working as a manufacturing consultant for struggling heavy industries — including Toyota and Mitsubishi — Deming found the Japanese far more receptive to his methods than American industry had been.

Japan's post-war conditions made efficiency essential. American supply chain specialist Gerhard Plenert has offered four reasons:

- Japan's lack of cash made it difficult for industry to finance the big-batch, large inventory production methods common elsewhere.
- Japan lacked space to build big factories loaded with inventory.
- The Japanese islands lack natural resources with which to build products.
- Japan had high unemployment, which meant that labor efficiency methods were not an obvious pathway to industrial success.

In response, Japanese manufacturers leaned out their processes: "They built smaller factories ... in which the only materials housed in the factory were those on which work was currently being done. In this way, inventory levels were kept low, investment in in-process inventories was at a minimum, and the investment in purchased natural resources was quickly turned around so that additional materials were purchased."

Toyota's Shigeo Shingo and Taiichi Ohno, building on Deming's teachings, redesigned Toyota's manufacturing process after the war. Toyota — originally a textile company that moved into automobiles in 1934 — had struggled with wasted resources from poor-quality castings. In 1936, after winning its first government truck contract, Toyota developed Kaizen improvement teams in response to new production problems. These teams eventually evolved into the Toyota Production System (TPS), and later into what became known in the West as The Toyota Way.

Levels of demand in the post-war economy of Japan were low; as a result, the focus of mass production on lowest cost per item via economies of scale had little application. Having visited supermarkets in the United States, Ohno recognized that the scheduling of work should not be driven by sales or production targets but by actual sales. Given the financial situation during this period, over-production had to be avoided, and thus the notion of "pull" (or "build-to-order" rather than target-driven "push") came to underpin production scheduling.

Japan still recognizes Deming's contribution through the Deming Prize, awarded annually to the world's best manufacturers.

American industrialists had recognized the threat of cheap offshore labor as early as the 1910s. Henry Towne, past president of the American Society of Mechanical Engineers, wrote in the foreword to Frederick Winslow Taylor's Shop Management (1911): "We are justly proud of the high wage rates which prevail throughout our country, and jealous of any interference with them by the products of the cheaper labor of other countries. To maintain this condition, to strengthen our control of home markets, and, above all, to broaden our opportunities in foreign markets where we must compete with the products of other industrial nations, we should welcome and encourage every influence tending to increase the efficiency of our productive processes."

=== Spread to the West ===
News of the Toyota Production System reached Western countries in 1977 through two English-language articles: one referred to the methodology as the "Ohno system", after Taiichi Ohno, who was instrumental in its development within Toyota; the other, by Toyota authors in an international journal, provided additional details.

Adoption accelerated after a landmark 1980 conference at Ford World Headquarters in Detroit, co-sponsored by the Repetitive Manufacturing Group (RMG) of the American Production and Inventory Control Society (APICS). The principal speaker, Fujio Cho (later president of Toyota Motor Corp.), explained the Toyota system to an American manufacturing audience.

By the mid-1980s, companies including Hewlett-Packard, Motorola, General Electric, Deere & Company, Westinghouse Electric, and Apple Inc. had adopted JIT practices. Omark Industries' Zero Inventory Production System (ZIPS) became a widely cited case study: at Omark's plant in Portland, Oregon, after 40 hours of ZIPS training, workers reduced a week's lead time at a stroke — "things ran smoother" — and ZIPS spread through operations "like an amoeba." At one of Omark's smaller plants in Mesabi, Minnesota making drill bits, large-size drill inventory was cut by 92%, productivity increased by 30%, scrap and rework dropped 20%, and lead time from order to finished product was slashed from three weeks to three days.

=== Coining the term ===
John Krafcik coined the term Lean in his 1988 article, "Triumph of the Lean Production System". The article states: (a) Lean manufacturing plants have higher levels of productivity and quality than non-Lean plants; and (b) "The level of plant technology seems to have little effect on operating performance." Risks with implementing Lean can be reduced by "developing a well-trained, flexible workforce, product designs that are easy to build with high quality, and a supportive, high-performance supplier network."

In 1996, researchers James Womack and Daniel Jones formally defined Lean in Lean Thinking, as detailed further in the books The Machine that Changed the World (1990) and Lean Thinking (1996). The term steadily replaced "JIT manufacturing" throughout the 1990s. Lean manufacturing is described as "a more recent name for JIT" that is "deeply rooted in the automotive industry and focuses mostly on repetitive manufacturing situations."

== The seven wastes ==
Toyota engineer Shigeo Shingo identified seven categories of waste (muda) to be eliminated:

1. Inventory — excess raw materials and finished goods
2. Overproduction — producing more than currently needed
3. Over-processing — working beyond the standard expected by the customer
4. Transportation — unnecessary movement of people or goods
5. Excess motion — automating or mechanizing before improving the method
6. Waiting — inactive periods due to job queues
7. Defects — reworking avoidable errors in products or processes

Later contributors identified additional waste types, including unused worker skills, poor metrics, and underutilization of employee ideas.

== Key principles ==
Womack and Jones define Lean as "a way to do more and more with less and less—less human effort, less equipment, less time, and less space—while coming closer and closer to providing customers exactly what they want" and identify five key principles:

1. Value — Specify the value desired by the customer; form a team for each product to stick with that product during its entire production cycle; enter into a dialogue with the customer (e.g. Voice of the customer).
2. Value stream — Identify the value stream for each product providing that value and challenge all of the wasted steps (generally nine out of ten) currently necessary to provide it.
3. Flow — Make the product flow continuously through the remaining value-added steps.
4. Pull — Introduce pull between all steps where continuous flow is impossible.
5. Perfection — Manage toward perfection so that the number of steps and the amount of time and information needed to serve the customer continually falls.

Lean is founded on the concept of continuous and incremental improvements on product and process while eliminating redundant activities. "The value of adding activities are simply only those things the customer is willing to pay for, everything else is waste, and should be eliminated, simplified, reduced, or integrated."

In 1999, Spear and Bowen identified four rules characterizing the "Toyota DNA":

1. All work shall be highly specified as to content, sequence, timing, and outcome.
2. Every customer-supplier connection must be direct, and there must be an unambiguous yes-or-no way to send requests and receive responses.
3. The pathway for every product and service must be simple and direct.
4. Any improvement must be made in accordance with the scientific method, under the guidance of a teacher, at the lowest possible level in the organization.

== Quantified outcomes ==
Published case studies provide empirical grounding for Lean's claimed benefits. A summary from Daman Products (1999) reported cycle times reduced by 97%, setup times by 50%, lead times from 4–8 weeks down to 5–10 days, and flow distance by 90%, achieved through cellular factories, pull scheduling, kanban, visual management, and employee empowerment.

A study from NCR (Dundee, Scotland, 1998), a make-to-order producer of automated teller machines, reported that switching to JIT over a single weekend eliminated buffer inventories, reduced inventory from 47 days to 5 days, flow time from 15 days to 2 days, with 60% of purchased parts arriving JIT and 77% going dock-to-line, and suppliers reduced from 480 to 165.

Hewlett-Packard, one of western industry's earliest JIT implementers, documented results across four divisions during the mid-1980s:

	Greeley	Fort Collins	Computer Systems	Vancouver
Inventory reduction	2.8 months	75%	75%	
Labor cost reduction	30%	15%		50%
Space reduction	50%	30%	33%	40%
WIP stock reduction	22 days to 1 day			
Production increase	100%			
Quality improvement		30% scrap, 79% rework	80% scrap	30% scrap & rework
Throughput time reduction		50%	17 days to 30 hours	
Standard hours reduction	50%			
No. of shipments increase				20%

== Criticism ==
=== Worker welfare ===
Lean is associated with an increased level of stress among employees, who have a small margin of error in their work environment which requires perfection. Employees are further at risk of precarious work when employed by factories that utilize just-in-time and flexible production techniques. A longitudinal study of US workers since 1970 indicates employers seeking to easily adjust their workforce in response to supply and demand conditions respond by creating more nonstandard work arrangements, such as contracting and temporary work.

=== Supply chain fragility ===
Natural and human-made disasters will disrupt the flow of energy, goods, and services. Down-stream customers will, in turn, not be able to produce their product because they were counting on incoming deliveries "just in time" and have little or no inventory to work with. For example, a severe geomagnetic storm could disrupt electrical power delivery for hours to years; lack of supplies on hand to repair the electrical system would have catastrophic effects.

The COVID-19 pandemic caused disruption in JIT practices, with quarantine restrictions on international trade interrupting supply while stockpiles were lacking, alongside increased demand for medical supplies like personal protective equipment (PPE) and ventilators. This has led to suggestions that stockpiles and diversification of suppliers should be more heavily focused upon.

According to Williams, ordering small quantities of materials can also cause difficulties in meeting suppliers' minimum order policies.

=== Short-termism and overfocus on waste ===
Lean also over-focuses on cutting waste, which may lead management to cut sectors of the company not essential to short-term productivity but nevertheless important to the company's legacy. Lean also over-focuses on the present, which hinders a company's plans for the future.

=== Lack of standardization ===
Critics note that "Lean is more a culture than a method, and there is no standard lean production model," which makes consistent implementation and evaluation difficult. Critics also make negative comparisons of Lean to 19th-century scientific management, which had been fought by the labor movement and was considered obsolete by the 1930s.

=== Lean accounting ===
A significant tension exists between Lean operations and standard cost accounting, the dominant accounting method in manufacturing since the early twentieth century. Standard cost accounting allocates overhead to products based on direct labor hours and evaluates managers on utilization and efficiency variances — metrics that can actively discourage Lean behavior. For example, a decision to reduce inventory (a core Lean goal) appears as a loss of overhead absorption in traditional accounts, making the improvement look like deteriorating performance.

The term lean accounting and its core method, value stream costing, were developed by Brian Maskell and Bruce Baggaley, whose book Practical Lean Accounting (2003) became the primary practitioner reference. Rather than allocating overhead through standard rates, value stream costing collects all actual costs — labor, materials, support services, and facilities — against each value stream and reports them weekly without variance adjustments. This gives managers clear, direct information tied to the lean improvements they are making. The principles reached a broader audience at the first Lean Accounting Summit, held in September 2005 in Dearborn, Michigan, attended by over 300 practitioners.

=== Supplier concentration ===
After years of success, the consolidation of Toyota's supply chain networks brought it to the position of being the world's biggest carmaker. In 2010, a crisis of safety-related problems at Toyota made other carmakers that had duplicated Toyota's supply chain system wary of similar recall issues. James Womack had warned Toyota that cooperating with single outsourced suppliers might bring unexpected problems.

== Key figures ==
Person	Contribution
W. Edwards Deming	Developed statistical quality methods; introduced modern efficiency principles to post-war Japan
Walter A. Shewhart	Statistical process control; co-developed foundational methods with Deming
Taiichi Ohno	Primary architect of the Toyota Production System
Shigeo Shingo	Formalized the seven wastes; developed SMED and other TPS tools
Henry Ford	Early application of flow and material efficiency in mass production
John Krafcik	Coined the term "Lean" in 1988
James P. Womack and Daniel T. Jones	Defined the five Lean principles; co-authored The Machine That Changed the World and Lean Thinking

== See also ==
- 5S (methodology)
- Andon (manufacturing)
- Jidoka
- Kaizen
- Kanban
- Lean accounting
- Lean services
- Lean software development
- Lean Six Sigma
- Takt time
- Toyota Production System
- The Toyota Way
- Value-stream mapping
