= Index of quality engineering articles =

This is an alphabetical list of articles pertaining specifically to quality engineering.

== A ==
- American Customer Satisfaction Index (ACSI)
- active listening
- affinity diagram
- Automotive Industry Action Group (AIAG)
- American Society for Quality (ASQ)
- Audit
- Appraisal

== B ==
- Bar chart
- Benchmarking

== C ==
- change management
- Code of Ethics
- Continuous quality improvement
- Cost of Poor Execution (COPE)
- Cost of quality (CoQ)
- Cost of poor quality (COPQ)
- Customer satisfaction research

== D ==
- Define, measure, analyze, improve and control (DMAIC)

== E ==
- European Foundation for Quality Management (EFQM)

== F ==
- Five whys

== G ==
- Groupthink
- Gantt chart

== H ==
- House of Quality
- Human reliability assessment (HRA)

== I ==
- Incrementalism

== J ==
- Joseph M. Juran

== K ==
- Kaizen

== L ==
- Lean manufacturing

== M ==
- Malcolm Baldrige National Quality Award
- Monitoring and evaluation
- Muda (Japanese term)

== N ==
- National Council on Physical Distribution Management (NCPDM)
- Next operation as customer(NOAC)
- Nine windows
- Nominal group technique

== O ==
- Organizational culture
- Overall equipment effectiveness (OEE)

== P ==
- Plan, Do, Check, Act (PDCA)
- Poka-yoke
- Process decision program chart (PDPC)
- Process improvement

== Q ==
- Quality assurance (QA)
- Quality by design (QbD)
- Quality function deployment (QFD)
- Quality improvement (QI)
- Quality management (QM)
- Quality storyboard

== R ==
- Risk management
- Root cause analysis

== S ==
- Suppliers, inputs, process, outputs and customers (SIPOC)
- Six Sigma
- Standardize-Do-Check-Act (SDCA)

== T ==
- Tactical planning
- Trade-off table

== U ==
- Union of Japanese Scientists and Engineers (JUSE)

== V ==
- Voice of the customer

== W ==
- Warranty
- Waste

== Z ==
- Zero Defects
