= Zero Defects =

Business program aiming to ensure no defects in quality

Zero Defects (or ZD) was a management-led program to eliminate defects in industrial production that enjoyed brief popularity in American industry from 1964 to the early 1970s. Quality expert Philip Crosby later incorporated it into his "Absolutes of Quality Management" and it enjoyed a renaissance in the American automobile industry—as a performance goal more than as a program—in the 1990s. Although applicable to any type of enterprise, it has been primarily adopted within supply chains wherever large volumes of components are being purchased (common items such as nuts and bolts are good examples).

== Definition ==
"[...] Zero Defects is a management tool aimed at the reduction of defects through prevention. It is directed at motivating people to prevent mistakes by developing a constant, conscious desire to do their job right the first time." — Zero Defects: A New Dimension in Quality Assurance

Zero Defects seeks to directly reverse the attitude that the number of mistakes a worker makes doesn't matter since inspectors will catch them before they reach the customer. This stands in contrast to activities that affect the worker directly, such as receiving a paycheck in the correct amount. Zero Defects involves reconditioning the worker "to take a personal interest in everything he does[,] by convincing him that his job is just as important as the task of the doctor or the dentist."

== History ==
The development of Zero Defects is credited to Philip B. Crosby, a quality control department manager on the Pershing missile program at the Martin Company, though at least one contemporary reference credits a small, unnamed group of Martin employees.

Zero Defects was not the first application of motivational techniques to production: during World War II, the War Department's "E for Excellence" program sought to boost production and minimize waste.

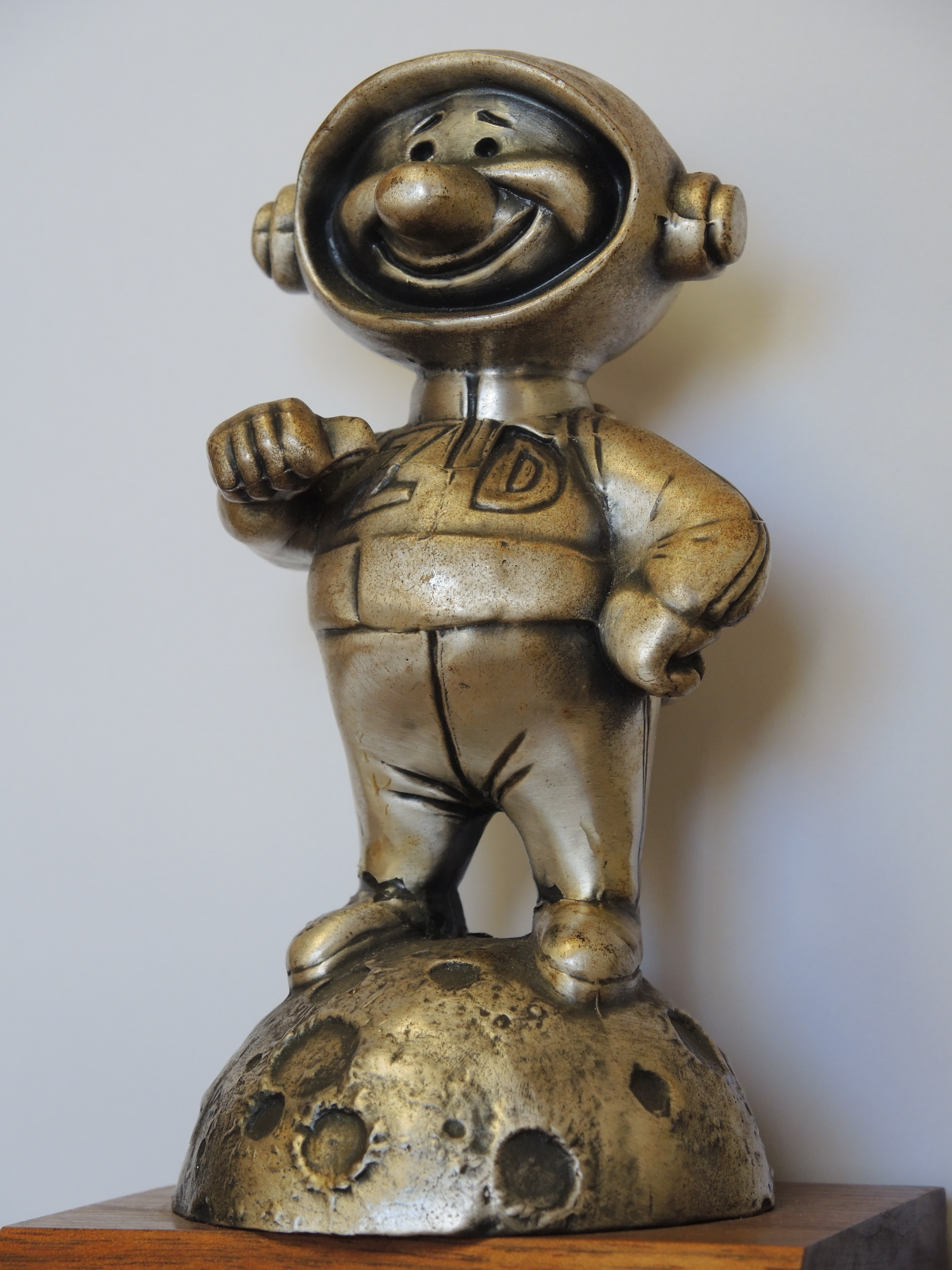
NASA Zero Defects award from the Apollo program

The Cold War resulted in increased spending on the development of defense technology in the 1950s and 1960s. Because of the safety-critical nature of such technology, particularly weapons systems, the government and defense firms came to employ hundreds of thousands of people in inspection and monitoring of highly-complex products assembled from hundreds of thousands of individual parts. This activity routinely uncovered defects in design, manufacture, and assembly and resulted in an expensive, drawn out cycle of inspection, rework, reinspection, and retest. Additionally, reports of spectacular missile failures appearing in the press appearing several times in the 50's and 60's (Note: For example: "AIR FORCE ROCKET SAID TO FAIL TEST; 1,500-Mile Missile Reported to Have Fallen and Burned at Florida Launching". The New York Times. January 1, 1957., "ATLAS SWITCH FAILED; Cutoff of Missile Launching Caused by Defective Part". The New York Times. July 14, 1958., "A 3-ENGINE ATLAS FALLS IN FLAMES; Most Powerful U. S. Missile Is Airborne Only 2 Minutes in Cape Canaveral Test". The New York Times. July 20, 1958., "Nike Zeus Anti-Missile Missile Destroys Itself in Test Failure; Soars to Two Miles in a Few Seconds Before Automatic Device Sets Off Explosion in the Second Stage". The New York Times. October 8, 1961., "A MISSILE FAILURE LAID TO HUMANS; Psychologist Tells of Error Over-Electric Sockets". The New York Times. September 5, 1962.) heightened the pressure to eliminate defects.

In 1961, the Martin Company's Orlando Florida facility embarked on an effort to increase quality awareness and specifically launched a program to drive down the number of defects in the Pershing missile to one half of the acceptable quality level in half a year's time. Subsequently, the Army asked that the missile be delivered a month earlier than the contract date in 1962. Martin marshaled all of its resources to meet this challenge and delivered the system with no discrepancies in hardware and documentation and were able to demonstrate operation within a day of the start of setup. After reviewing how Martin was able to overachieve, its management came to the conclusion that while it had not insisted on perfection in the past, it had in this instance, and that was all that was needed to attain outstanding product quality.

Management commissioned a team to examine the phenomenon and come up with an action plan, which became the organizing, motivating, and initiating elements of Zero Defects. The Department of Defense also took notice and in 1964, began to actively encourage its vendors to adopt Zero Defects programs. Interest in the program from outside firms, including Litton Industries, Thiokol, Westinghouse, and Bendix Corporation, was keen and many made visits to Martin to learn about it. Their feedback was incorporated and rounded out the program. In particular, General Electric suggested that error cause removal be included in the program.

Martin claimed a 54% defect reduction in defects in hardware under government audit during the first two years of the program. General Electric reported a $2 million reduction in rework and scrap costs, RCA reported 75% of its departments in one division were achieving Zero Defects, and Sperry Corporation reported a 54% defect reduction over a single year.

During its heyday, it was adopted by General Electric, ITT Corporation, Montgomery Ward, the United States Army among other organizations.

While Zero Defects began in the aerospace and defense industry, thirty years later it was regenerated in the automotive world. During the 1990s, large companies in the automotive industry cut costs by reducing their quality inspection processes and demanding that their suppliers dramatically improve the quality of their supplies.

== Later developments ==
In 1979, Crosby penned Quality Is Free: The Art of Making Quality Certain which preserved the idea of Zero Defects in a Quality Management Maturity Grid, in a 14-step quality improvement program, and in the concept of the "Absolutes of Quality Management". The quality improvement program incorporated ideas developed or popularized by others (for example, cost of quality (step 4), employee education (step 8), and quality councils (step 13)) with the core motivation techniques of booklets, films, posters, speeches, and the "ZD Day" centerpiece.

=== Absolutes of Quality Management ===
According to Crosby, there are four Absolutes:

==== 1. "The definition of quality is conformance to requirements" ====
Newcomers to manufacturing bring their own vague impressions of what quality involves. But in order to tackle quality-related problems, there must be widespread agreement on the specifics of what quality means for a particular product. Customer needs and expectations must be reduced to measurable quantities like length, or smoothness, or roundness and a standard must be specified for each. These become the requirements for a product and the organization must inspect, or measure what comes out of the production process against those standards to determine whether the product conforms to those requirements or not. An important implication of this is that if management does not specify these requirements workers invent their own which may not align with what management would have intended had they provided explicit requirements to begin with.

==== 2. "The system of quality is prevention" ====
Companies typically focus on inspection to ensure that defective product doesn't reach the customer. But this is both costly and still lets nonconformances through. Prevention, in the form of "pledging ourselves to make a constant conscious effort to do our jobs right the first time", is the only way to guarantee zero defects. Beyond that, examining the production process for steps where defects can occur and mistake proofing them contributes to defect-free production.

==== 3. "The performance standard is Zero Defects" ====
Workers, at least during the post–World War II economic expansion, had a lackadaisical attitude on the whole toward work. Crosby saw statistical quality control and the MIL-Q-9858 standard as contributing to this through acceptable quality levels—a concept that allows a certain number of acceptable defects and reinforces the attitude that mistakes are inevitable. Another contributor is the self-imposed pressure to produce something to sell, even if that thing is defective. Workers must "make the attitude of Zero Defects [their] personal standard."

==== 4. "The measurement of quality is the price of nonconformance" ====
To convince executives to take action to resolve issues of poor quality, costs associated with poor quality must be measured in monetary terms. Crosby uses the term "the price of nonconformance" in preference to "the cost of quality" to overcome the misimpression that higher quality requires higher costs. The point of writing Quality Is Free was to demonstrate that quality improvement efforts pay for themselves. Crosby divides quality-related costs into the price of conformance and the price of nonconformance. The price of conformance includes quality-related planning, inspection, and auditing; the price of nonconformance includes scrap, rework, claims against warranty, unplanned service

== Criticisms ==
The main criticism is the amount of effort required to verify every person's performance in an organization. Confidence in the program, and therefore compliance with it, fades without this verification.

Point 10 of Deming's 14 points ("Eliminate slogans, exhortations, and targets for the work force asking for zero defects and new levels of productivity.") is clearly aimed at ZD. Joseph M. Juran was also critical of ZD.

Another criticism is that Zero Defects is a motivational program aimed at encouraging employees to do better. Crosby stated that "Motivation has nothing to do with it...It is merely setting performance standards that no one can misunderstand and then starting a two-way communications exercise to let everyone know about it." He blamed management actions and attitudes for creating the opportunity for defects.

== See also ==
- Six Sigma
- Total Quality Management
