= Quality (business) =

Conformity of goods or services

In business, engineering, and manufacturing, quality has a pragmatic interpretation as the conformity of something (goods or services); it is defined as being suitable for the intended purpose (fitness for purpose) while satisfying customer expectations. Quality may be a perceptual, conditional, and somewhat subjective attribute and may be understood differently by different people. Consumers may focus on the specification quality of a product/service, or how it compares to competitors in the marketplace. Producers might measure the conformance quality, or degree to which the product/service was produced correctly. Support personnel may measure quality in the degree that a product is reliable, maintainable, or sustainable. In such ways, the subjectivity of quality is rendered objective via operational definitions and measured with metrics such as proxy measures.

In a general manner, quality in business consists of "producing a good or service that conforms [to the specification of the client] the first time, in the right quantity, and at the right time". The product or service should not be lower or higher than the specification (under or overquality).

== Description ==
There are many aspects of quality in a business context, though primary is the idea the business produces something, whether it be a physical good or a particular service. These goods and/or services and how they are produced involve many types of processes, procedures, equipment, personnel, and investments, which all fall under the quality umbrella. Key aspects of quality and how it's diffused throughout the business are rooted in the concept of quality management:

1. Quality planning is implemented as a means of "developing the products, systems, and processes needed to meet or exceed customer expectations." This includes defining who the customers are, determining their needs, and developing the tools (systems, processes, etc.) needed to meet those needs.
2. Quality assurance is implemented as a means of providing enough confidence that business requirements and goals (as outlined in quality planning) for a product and/or service will be fulfilled. This error prevention is done through systematic measurement, comparison with a standard, and monitoring of processes.
3. Quality control (QC) is implemented as a means of fulfilling quality requirements, reviewing all factors involved in production. The business confirms that the good or service produced meets organizational goals, often using tools such as operational auditing and inspection. QC is focused on process output.
4. Quality improvement is implemented as a means of providing mechanisms for the evaluation and improvement of processes, etc. in the light of their efficiency, effectiveness, and flexibility. This may be done with noticeably significant changes or incrementally via continual improvement.

While quality management and its tenets are relatively recent phenomena, the idea of quality in business is not new. In the early 1900s, pioneers such as Frederick Winslow Taylor and Henry Ford recognized the limitations of the methods being used in mass production at the time and the subsequent varying quality of output, implementing quality control, inspection, and standardization procedures in their work. Later in the twentieth century, the likes of William Edwards Deming and Joseph M. Juran helped take quality to new heights, initially in Japan and later (in the late '70s and early '80s) globally.

Customers recognize that quality is an important attribute in products and services, and suppliers recognize that quality can be an important differentiator between their own offerings and those of competitors (the quality gap). In the past two decades this quality gap has been gradually decreasing between competitive products and services. This is partly due to the contracting (also called outsourcing) of manufacturing to countries like China and India, as well internationalization of trade and competition. These countries, among many others, have raised their own standards of quality in order to meet international standards and customer demands. The ISO 9000 series of standards are probably the best known international standards for quality management, though specialized standards such as ISO 15189 (for medical laboratories) and ISO 14001 (for environmental management) also exist.

The business meanings of quality have developed over time. Various interpretations are given below:

1. American Society for Quality: "A combination of quantitative and qualitative perspectives for which each person has his or her own definition; examples of which include, "Meeting the requirements and expectations in service or product that were committed to" and "Pursuit of optimal solutions contributing to confirmed successes, fulfilling accountabilities". In technical usage, quality can have two meanings:
  a. The characteristics of a product or service that bear on its ability to satisfy stated or implied needs;
  b. A product or service free of deficiencies."
2. Subir Chowdhury: "Quality combines people power and process power."
3. Philip B. Crosby: "Conformance to requirements." The requirements may not fully represent customer expectations; Crosby treats this as a separate problem.
4. W. Edwards Deming: concentrating on "the efficient production of the quality that the market expects," and he linked quality and management: "Costs go down and productivity goes up as improvement of quality is accomplished by better management of design, engineering, testing and by improvement of processes."
5. Peter Drucker: "Quality in a product or service is not what the supplier puts in. It is what the customer gets out and is willing to pay for."
6. ISO 9000: "Degree to which a set of inherent characteristics of an object fulfils requirements."
7. Joseph M. Juran: "Fitness for use." Fitness is defined by the customer.
8. Noriaki Kano and others, present a two-dimensional model of quality: "must-be quality" and "attractive quality." The former is near to "fitness for use" and the latter is what the customer would love, but has not yet thought about. Supporters characterize this model more succinctly as: "Products and services that meet or exceed customers' expectations."
9. Robert Pirsig: "The result of care."
10. Six Sigma: "Number of defects per million opportunities."
11. Genichi Taguchi, with two definitions:
  a. "Uniformity around a target value." The idea is to lower the standard deviation in outcomes, and to keep the range of outcomes to a certain number of standard deviations, with rare exceptions.
  b. "The loss a product imposes on society after it is shipped." This definition of quality is based on a more comprehensive view of the production system.
12. Gerald M. Weinberg: "Value to some person".

== Market sector perspectives ==
=== Operations management ===
Traditionally, quality acts as one of five operations/project performance objectives dictated by operations management policy. Operations management, by definition, focuses on the most effective and efficient ways for creating and delivering a good or service that satisfies customer needs and expectations. As such, its ties to quality are apparent. The five performance objectives which give business a way to measure their operational performance are:

- quality, measuring how well a product or service conforms to specifications;
- speed (or response time), measuring the delay between customer request and customer receipt of a product or service;
- dependability, measuring how consistently a product or service can be delivered to meet customer expectation;
- flexibility, measuring how quickly the business can adapt to a variety of market changes; and
- cost, measuring the resources (and by extension, financed) required to plan, deliver, and improve the finished good or service.

Based on an earlier model called the sand cone model, these objectives support each other, with quality at the base. By extension, quality increases dependability, reduces cost, and increases customer satisfaction.

=== Manufacturing ===
The early 1920s saw a slow but gradual movement among manufacturers away from a "maximum production" philosophy to one aligned more closely with "positive and continuous control of quality to definite standards in the factory." That standardization, further pioneered by Deming and Juran later in the twentieth century, has become deeply integrated into how manufacturing businesses operate today. The introduction of the ISO 9001, 9002, and 9003 standards in 1987 — based on work from previous British and U.S. military standards — sought to "provide organizations with the requirements to create a quality management system (QMS) for a range of different business activities." Additionally, good manufacturing practice (GMP) standards became more common place in countries around the world, laying out the minimum requirements manufacturers in industries including food and beverages, cosmetics, pharmaceutical products, dietary supplements, and medical devices must meet to assure their products are consistently high in quality. Process improvement philosophies such as Six Sigma and Lean Six Sigma have further pushed quality to the forefront of business management and operations. At the heart of these and other efforts is often the QMS, a documented collection of processes, management models, business strategies, human capital, and information technology used to plan, develop, deploy, evaluate, and improve a set of models, methods, and tools across an organization for the purpose of improving quality that aligns with the organization's strategic goals.

=== Service sector ===
The push to integrate the concept of quality into the functions of the service industry takes a slightly different path from manufacturing. Where manufacturers focus on "tangible, visible, persistent issues," many — but not all — quality aspects of the service provider's output are intangible and fleeting. Other obstacles include management's perceptions not aligning with customer expectations due to lack of communication and market research and the improper or lack of delivery of skill-based knowledge to personnel. Like manufacturing, customer expectations are key in the service industry, though the degree with which the service interacts with the customer definitely shapes perceived service quality. Perceptions such as being dependable, responsive, understanding, competent, and clean (which are difficult to describe tangibly) may drive service quality, somewhat in contrast to factors that drive measurement of manufacturing quality.

=== Quality in Japanese culture ===
In Japanese culture, there are two types of quality: atarimae hinshitsu and miryokuteki hinshitsu.

- atarimae hinshitsu – The idea that things will work as they are supposed to (e.g. a pen will write). The functional requirement actually. For example, a wall or flooring in a house have functional parts in the house as a product; when the functionality is met, the "atarimae" quality requirement is met.
- miryokuteki hinshitsu (魅力的品質) – The idea that things should have an aesthetic quality which is different from "atarimae hinshitsu" (e.g. a pen will write in a way that is pleasing to the writer, and leave behind ink that is pleasing to the reader). The floor and wall example can be expanded to include the color, texture, shine, polish, etc., which are the "miryokuteki" aspects. Such aspects comprise a very important part of the quality, and add value to the product.

In the design of goods or services, atarimae hinshitsu and miryokuteki hinshitsu together ensure that a creation will both work to customers' expectations and also be desirable to have.

== Quality management techniques ==
- Quality management systems
- Total quality management (TQM)
- Design of experiments
  - Fractional factorial design
  - Optimal design
  - Response surface methodology
- Continuous improvement
- Six Sigma
- Statistical Process Control (SPC)
- Quality circles
- Requirements analysis
- Verification and validation
- Zero Defects
- Service quality
- SERVQUAL
- Theory of constraints (TOC)
- Business process management (BPM)
- Business process re-engineering
- Capability maturity models
- Quality function deployment (QFD)

== Quality awards ==
- Deming Prize
- EFQM Excellence Award
- Malcolm Baldrige National Quality Award

== See also ==
- Common law of business balance
- Eight dimensions of quality
- Innovation and Tax deduction
- ISO 9000
- Metaphysics of quality
- Quality assurance
- Quality control
- Quality engineering
- Quality investing
- Six Sigma
- Software quality
- theory of constraints
- W. Edwards Deming
- List of economics topics
- List of production topics

== Bibliography ==
- Boone, Louis E. & Kurtz, David L., Contemporary Business 2006, Thomson South-Western, 2006
- Rochfort Scott, Charles & Hamerton, Robert Jacob, Rambles in Egypt and Candia: With Details of the Military Power and Resources of Those Countries, and Observations on the Government, Policy, and Commercial System of Mohammed Ali, Volume I, H. Colburn, London, 1837
