= Industrial change in occupied Japan =

Japanese industry leaders began to turn their manufacturing establishment around after World War II under the United States-led Allied occupation.

== The American Occupation's Industrial Consultancy ==
The most popular Japanese radio program in the 1950s is reputed to have been "Quality for Foremen." This emphasis on shop-floor leadership began through the intervention of three civil communications engineers who were part of the American occupation: Frank Polkinghorn, Charles Protzman, both from AT&T, and Homer Sarasohn of MIT's Radiation Laboratory, who headed the occupation's Civil Communications Section (CCS). The Japanese had been trying to introduce scientific management practices, common in America, since 1913, and their failure to make changes contributed to their losing World War II. Japanese industries' leadership had been purged by the MacArthur occupation. This removed 2 obstacles to change: the rigid social stratification of business (which meant that communication flowed one way only), and the lack of technical qualifications in both management and the workforce. Japanese management, according to Bunzaemon Inoue (late President of Sumitomo Rubber) was "all line, no staff." The CCS section introduced seminars for electronics industry leaders in 1949, and expanded versions of these CCS Seminars as they were called, may have stimulated some of the interest in the "Quality for Foreman" show.

== The KACHO System ==
According to Kenneth Hopper, the Japanese were attempting to copy the American practice of "bottom up management," although the CCS seminar did not use the term which was introduced by Peter Drucker in the mid-1950s. The kacho system was evolved as the unique Japanese way of moving responsibility to the lowest acceptable level. "Essentially a kacho is responsible for an area of activity. In a large factory making electrical consumer goods, he might be in charge of white goods... production in all its aspects. ... the strength of the kacho system [is that one person] knows or should know everything that goes on beneath, alongside and above him...: company policy, research, relations with customers and suppliers, information about the competition, and all activities on the shop floor."

The CCS seminar was developed in 1949 and presented by the Americans in Tokyo; a second session was held in Osaka in 1950, and these were the models that were taken up by Nikkeiren, the Japanese employers' association. Their training events continued until 1974. Other vital elements of the CCS seminars included: flexibility, decentralization, and cross-departmental teamwork.

== Other American Seminars and Leaders ==
Hopper further notes that a lecture series on statistical quality control by W. Edwards Deming (also in 1950) and the work of Joseph M. Juran were also vital elements of what came to be known as the Japanese economic miracle. While this comment in no way resolves a controversy about the genesis of Japan’s postwar industrial resurrection, his discussion throws light on the chronology of Western contributions to that effort.

Dr K Ishikawa on Dr Deming from 1950 to 1953 and then why Dr JM Juran was invited to rectify the three problems Dr Deming created.

Dr Kaoru Ishikawa 1989 "Introduction to Quality Control" page 10. "In 1950, JUSE invited Dr W E Deming from the US to conduct a QC seminar for top management, department and section managers, and engineers. This seminar was extremely enlightening; with the proceeds donated by Dr Deming for the sale of his transcripts, the Deming Prize for Quality Control was inaugurated in 1951. This scheme contributed immeasurably to the progress of quality control in Japan."

"Initially, however, Japanese quality control also suffered from various problems. The first was that statistical methods were overemphasized, and this fostered the mistaken impression that quality control and statistical quality control were difficult. Second, the emphasis on standardization led to the tendency for quality control to be carried out merely formally. The third problem was that top management and department and section managers did not develop much enthusiasm for quality control."

"To help solve these problems, Dr J. M. Juran was invited to Japan in 1954 to give a seminar for executives and department and section managers. Quality control at last started to be used as a management tool. This marked the beginning of a gradual transition from statistical quality control to total quality control, and in turn led to the promotion of quality control in which all departments and all employees participated - in other words, title or company-wide quality control.” “This required the involvement of the workplace, and, in 1956, high-quality control course for foremen was started on Japan shortwave radio.” Page 18 provides a figure 1.2 called “The Philosophy of the Control of Quality: The Deming Cycle. Being 1. Planning and design 2. Production 3. Marketing 4. After-sales service and market surveys – that leads to Redesign and a Move Forward”. Further explained on page 20 “from one viewpoint, this is the fundamental ideal of quality the control. Since this approach was introduced to Japan by Dr Deming in 1950, it is also known in Japan as the Deming cycle. Dr Deming himself, however, said that it was Dr Shewhart’s idea and that the diagram should be called the Shewhart Cycle.” On page 37, figure 1.8 it was summarized as the “plan-do-check-act (PDCA) cycle, but this is also insufficient, and I had success with splitting the cycle up into the six steps in figure 1.9. This really is a scientific management procedure using the QC approach”.

== Sources ==
- https://www.amazon.co.uk/Introduction-Quality-Control-Kaoru-Ishikawa/dp/9401176906
