= Jionghua Jin =

Chinese-American industrial engineer

Jionghua (Judy) Jin is a Chinese-American industrial engineer whose research involves quality engineering, advanced manufacturing, and data fusion. She is a professor of industrial and operations engineering at the University of Michigan, where she directs the manufacturing program in the division of integrative systems and design.

== Education and career ==
Jin has bachelor's and master's degrees from Southeast University in China, earned in 1984 and 1987 respectively, and worked as a lecturer at Southeast University from 1987 to 1994. She completed a Ph.D. in industrial and operations engineering at the University of Michigan in 1999.

She became an assistant professor of systems and industrial engineering at the University of Arizona in 2000, and returned to the University of Michigan as an associate professor in 2005. She became a full professor in 2011.

== Recognition ==
Jin is a recipient of the 2002 Presidential Early Career Award for Scientists and Engineers. Jin was named a Fellow of the American Society of Mechanical Engineers in 2012, a Fellow of the Institute of Industrial and Systems Engineers in 2015, and a Fellow of the Institute for Operations Research and the Management Sciences in 2020.
