= Quality circle =

Group of workers that analyzes and solves work-related problems

A quality circle or quality control circle is a group of workers who do the same or similar work, who meet regularly to identify, analyze and solve work-related problems. It consists of minimum three and maximum twelve members in number. Normally small in size, the group is usually led by a supervisor or manager and presents its solutions to management; where possible, workers implement the solutions themselves in order to improve the performance of the organization and motivate employees. Quality circles were at their most popular during the 1980s, but continue to exist in the form of Kaizen groups and similar worker participation schemes.

Typical topics for the attention of quality circles are improving occupational safety and health, improving product design, and improvement in the workplace and manufacturing processes. The term quality circles was most accessibly defined by Professor Kaoru Ishikawa in his 1985 handbook, "What is Total Quality Control? The Japanese Way" and circulated throughout Japanese industry by the Union of Japanese Scientists and Engineers in 1960. The first company in Japan to introduce Quality Circles was the Nippon Wireless and Telegraph Company in 1962. By the end of that year there were 36 companies registered with JUSE by 1978 the movement had grown to an estimated 1 million Circles involving some 10 million Japanese workers. The movement built on work by Dr. W. Edwards Deming during the Allied Occupation of Japan, for which the Deming Prize was established in 1950, as well as work by Joseph M. Juran in 1954.

Quality circles are typically more formal groups. They meet regularly on company time and are trained by competent persons (usually designated as facilitators) who may be personnel and industrial relations specialists trained in human factors and the basic skills of problem identification, information gathering and analysis, basic statistics, and solution generation. Quality circles are generally free to select any topic they wish (other than those related to salary and terms and conditions of work, as there are other channels through which these issues are usually considered).

Quality circles have the advantage of continuity; the circle remains intact from project to project. (For a comparison to Quality Improvement Teams, see Juran's Quality by Design.).

Handbook of Quality Circle: Quality circle is a people-development concept based on the premise that an employee doing a certain task is the most informed person in that topic and, as a result, is in a better position to identify, analyse, and handle work-related challenges through their innovative and unique ideas. It is, in fact, a practical application of McGregor's Theory Y, which argues that if employees are given the right atmosphere and decision-making authority, they will enjoy and take pride in their work, resulting in a more fulfilling work life. A quality circle is a small group of workers that work in the same area or do similar sorts of work and meet once a week for an hour to identify, analyse, and resolve work-related issues. The objective is to improve the quality, productivity, and overall performance of the company, as well as the workers' quality of life at work. TQM World Institution of Quality Excellence publication division published a book, "Handbook of Quality Circle" by Prasanta Kumar Barik which tried to bring all the theoretical concepts with detailed implementation steps for Quality Circle. This will be useful in Quality Circle implementation in all types of organizations.

== History ==
Quality circles were originally described by W. Edwards Deming in the 1950s, Deming praised Toyota as an example of the practice. The idea was later formalized across Japan in 1962 and expanded by others such as Kaoru Ishikawa. The Japanese Union of Scientists and Engineers (JUSE) coordinated the movement in Japan. The first circles started at the Nippon Wireless and Telegraph Company; the idea then spread to more than 35 other companies in the first year. By 1978 it was claimed by JUSE in their publication Gemba to QC Circles, that there were more than one million quality circles involving some 10 million Japanese workers. As of 2015 they operate in most East Asian countries; it was recently claimed by the President of the Chinese Quality Circles Society at the ICSQCC Conference in Beijing 30 August 1997 that there were more than 20 million quality circles in China.

Quality circles have been implemented even in educational sectors in India, and QCFI (Quality Circle Forum of India) is promoting such activities. However this was not successful in the United States, as the idea was not properly understood and implementation turned into a fault-finding exercise – although some circles do still exist. Don Dewar, founder of Quality Digest together with Wayne Ryker and Jeff Beardsley established quality circles in 1972 at the Lockheed Space Missile factory in California.

TQM World Institution of Quality Excellence (TQM-WIQE) through its E-learning division Quality Excellence Forum (QEF) is providing training on Quality Circle with three different levels of certification for better implementation of Quality Circle worldwide. The certifications level are Quality Circle Fundamentals (QCF), Quality Circle Professional (QCP) and Quality Circle Master (QCM).

== Empirical studies ==
In a structures-fabrication and assembly plant in the south-eastern US, some quality circles (QCs) were established by the management (management-initiated); whereas others were formed based on requests of employees (self-initiated). Based on 47 QCs over a three-year period, research showed that management-initiated QCs have fewer members, solve more work-related QC problems, and solve their problems much faster than self-initiated QCS. However, the effect of QC initiation (management- vs. self-initiated) on problem-solving performance disappears after controlling QC size. A high attendance of QC meetings is related to lower number of projects completed and slow speed of performance in management-initiated QCS QCs with high upper-management support (high attendance of QC meetings) solve significantly more problems than those without. Active QCs had lower rate of problem-solving failure, higher attendance rate at QC meetings, and higher net savings of QC projects than inactive QCs. QC membership tends to decrease over the three-year period. Larger QCs have a better chance of survival than smaller QCs. A significant drop in QC membership is a precursor of QC failure. The sudden decline in QC membership represents the final and irreversible stage of the QC's demise. Attributions of quality circles' problem-solving failure vary across participants of QCs: Management, supporting staff, and QC members.

There are seven basic quality improvement tools that circles use:

- Cause-and-effect diagrams (sometimes called Ishikawa or "fishbone" diagrams)
- Pareto charts
- Process mapping, data gathering tools such as check sheets
- Graphical tools such as histograms, frequency diagrams, spot charts and pie charts
- Run charts and control charts
- Scatter plots and correlation analysis
- Flowcharts

== Student quality circles ==
Student quality circles work on the original philosophy of total quality management. The idea of SQCs was presented by City Montessori School (CMS) Lucknow India at a conference in Hong Kong in October 1994. It was developed and mentored by two engineers of Indian Railways PC, Bihari and Swami Das, in association with Principal Dr. Kamran of CMS Lucknow India. They were inspired and facilitated by Jagdish Gandhi, who founded CMS after his visit to Japan, where he learned about Kaizen. CMS has continued to conduct international conventions on student quality circles every two years. After seeing its utility, educators from many countries started such circles.

The World Council for Total Quality & Excellence in Education was established in 1999 with its Corporate Office in Lucknow and head office in Singapore. It monitors and facilitates student quality circle activities in its member countries, which number more than a dozen. SQC's are considered to be a co-curricular activity. They have been established in India, Bangladesh, Pakistan, Nepal, Sri Lanka, Turkey, Mauritius, Iran, UK (Kingston University and started in University of Leicester), and USA.

In Nepal, Prof. Dinesh P. Chapagain has been promoting the approach through QUEST-Nepal since 1999. He has written a book entitled A Guide Book on Students' Quality Circle: An Approach to prepare Total Quality People, which is considered a standard guide to promote SQC's in academia for students' personality development.

The TQM World Institution of Quality Excellence through its Academic Outreach Initiative (WIQE-AOI), promoting Student Quality Circle concept. Its providing training and certification for students and mentors at Universities, Management & Engineering Institutions and schools for better implementation of Student Quality Circle in academics and overall growth of students.

== See also ==
- Kaizen
- Participatory management
