= Donald Wheeler =

Donald Wheeler may refer to:

- Donald Niven Wheeler (1913–2002), social activist, teacher, member of the Communist Party, and accused Soviet spy
- Donald J. Wheeler, American author, statistician and expert in quality control
