= NOAC =

NOAC may refer to:

- National Order of the Arrow Conference, an event of Scouting America’s honor society
- Negros Occidental Agricultural College
- Next operation as customer
- NOAC (integrated circuit) (NES-on-a-chip) in Famiclones
- Novel oral anticoagulants, blood-thinning medication
