= OCPM =

OCPM can stand for:

- In the United States, a podiatric medical school:
  - Ohio College of Podiatric Medicine (Now Kent State University College of Podiatric Medicine)
- and United States incorporations and businesses:
  - Orthodox Christian Prison Ministry
  - Orange County Performance Motorsports
  - Our Chronic Pain Mission
- In the State of Ohio – a government HRD program:
  - Ohio Certified Public Manager Program
- In Canada – an official agency in Montreal:
  - Office de Consultation Publique de Montreal
- Software for Opera (web browser):
  - Opera Customizer & Profile Maker
