= Total quality management =

Approach to business improvement

Total quality management (TQM) is an organization-wide effort to "install and make a permanent climate where employees continuously improve their ability to provide on-demand products and services that customers will find of particular value."

Total quality management (TQM) emphasizes that all departments, not just production (such as sales, marketing, accounting, finance, engineering, and design), are responsible for improving their operations. Management, in this context, highlights the obligation of executives to actively oversee quality through adequate funding, training, staffing, and goal setting.

Although there isn't a universally agreed-upon methodology, TQM initiatives typically leverage established tools and techniques from quality control. TQM gained significant prominence in the late 1980s and early 1990s before being largely superseded by other quality management frameworks, such as ISO 9000, Lean manufacturing, and Six Sigma.

== History ==
In the late 1970s and early 1980s, the developed countries of North America and Western Europe suffered economically in the face of stiff competition from Japan's ability to produce high-quality goods at competitive cost. For the first time since the start of the Industrial Revolution, the United Kingdom became a net importer of finished goods. The United States undertook its own soul-searching, expressed most pointedly in the television broadcast of If Japan Can... Why Can't We? Firms began reexamining the techniques of quality control invented over the previous 50 years and how the Japanese had successfully employed those techniques. It was in the midst of this economic turmoil that TQM took root.

The exact origin of the term "total quality management" is uncertain. It is almost certainly inspired by Armand V. Feigenbaum's multi-edition book Total Quality Control (OCLC 299383303) and Kaoru Ishikawa's What Is Total Quality Control? The Japanese Way (OCLC 11467749). It may have been first coined in the United Kingdom by the Department of Trade and Industry during its 1983 "National Quality Campaign". Or it may have been first coined in the United States by the Naval Air Systems Command to describe its quality-improvement efforts in 1985.

=== Development in the United States ===
In the spring of 1984, an arm of the United States Navy asked some of its civilian researchers to assess statistical process control and the work of several prominent quality consultants, and to make recommendations on how to apply their approaches to improve the Navy's operational effectiveness. The recommendation was to adopt the teachings of W. Edwards Deming. The Navy branded the effort "Total Quality Management" in 1985. (Note: The Navy rebranded its effort "Total Quality Leadership" in 1990.)

From the Navy, TQM spread throughout the US Federal Government, resulting in the following:

- The creation of the Malcolm Baldrige National Quality Award in August 1987
- The creation of the Federal Quality Institute in June 1988
- The adoption of TQM by many elements of government and the armed forces, including the United States Department of Defense, United States Army, and United States Coast Guard

The US Environmental Protection Agency's Underground Storage Tanks program, established in 1985, also employed Total Quality Management to develop its management approach. The private sector followed suit, flocking to TQM principles not only as a means to recapture market share from the Japanese, but also to remain competitive when bidding for contracts from the Federal Government since "total quality" requires involving suppliers, not just employees, in process improvement efforts.

== Features ==
There is no widespread agreement as to what TQM is and what actions it requires of organizations, however a review of the original United States Navy effort gives a rough understanding of what is involved in TQM.

The key concepts in the TQM effort undertaken by the Navy in the 1980s include:

- "Quality is defined by customers' requirements."
- "Top management has direct responsibility for quality improvement."
- "Increased quality comes from systematic analysis and improvement of work processes."
- "Quality improvement is a continuous effort and conducted throughout the organization."

The Navy used the following tools and techniques:

- The PDCA cycle to drive issues to resolution
- Ad hoc cross-functional teams (similar to quality circles) responsible for addressing immediate process issues
- Standing cross-functional teams responsible for the improvement of processes over the long term
- Active management participation through steering committees
- Use of the Seven Basic Tools of Quality to analyze quality-related issues

=== Notable definitions ===
While there is no generally accepted definition of TQM, several notable organizations have attempted to define it. These include:

==== United States Department of Defense (1988) ====
"Total Quality Management (TQM) in the Department of Defense is a strategy for continuously improving performance at every level, and in all areas of responsibility. It combines fundamental management techniques, existing improvement efforts, and specialized technical tools under a disciplined structure focused on continuously improving all processes. Improved performance is directed at satisfying such broad goals as cost, quality, schedule, and mission need and suitability. Increasing user satisfaction is the overriding objective. The TQM effort builds on the pioneering work of Dr. W. E. Deming, Dr. J. M. Juran, and others, and benefits from both private and public sector experience with continuous process improvement."

==== British Standards Institution standard BS 7850-1:1992 ====
"A management philosophy and company practices that aim to harness the human and material resources of an organization in the most effective way to achieve the objectives of the organization."

==== International Organization for Standardization standard ISO 8402:1994 ====
"A management approach of an organisation centred on quality, based on the participation of all its members and aiming at long term success through customer satisfaction and benefits to all members of the organisation and society."

==== The American Society for Quality ====
"A term first used to describe a management approach to quality improvement. Since then, TQM has taken on many meanings. Simply put, it is a management approach to long-term success through customer satisfaction. TQM is based on all members of an organization participating in improving processes, products, services and the culture in which they work. The methods for implementing this approach are found in the teachings of such quality leaders as Philip B. Crosby, W. Edwards Deming, Armand V. Feigenbaum, Kaoru Ishikawa and Joseph M. Juran."

==== The Chartered Quality Institute ====
"TQM is a philosophy for managing an organization in a way which enables it to meet stakeholder needs and expectations efficiently and effectively, without compromising ethical values."

==== Baldrige Excellence Framework ====
In the United States, the Baldrige Award, created by Public Law 100–107, annually recognizes American businesses, education institutions, health care organizations, and government or nonprofit organizations that are role models for organizational performance excellence. Organizations are judged on criteria from seven categories:

1. Leadership
2. Strategy
3. Customers
4. Measurement, analysis, and knowledge management
5. Workforce
6. Operations
7. Results

Example criteria are:

- How do you obtain information on your customers' satisfaction relative to their satisfaction with your competitors?
- How do you select, collect, align, and integrate data and information for tracking daily operations?
- How do you manage your workforce, its needs, and your needs to ensure continuity, prevent workforce reductions, and minimize the impact of workforce reductions, if they do become necessary?

Joseph M. Juran believed the Baldrige Award judging criteria to be the most widely accepted description of what TQM entails.

=== Standards ===
During the 1990s, standards bodies in Belgium, France, Germany, Turkey, and the United Kingdom attempted to standardize TQM. While many of these standards have since been explicitly withdrawn, they all are effectively superseded by ISO 9000:

- BS 7850-1: Total Quality Management - Part 1: Guide to Management Principles, London, England: British Standards Institution, 1992, ISBN 978-0-580-21156-0, OCLC 655881602, BS 7850
- BS 7850-2: Total Quality Management - Part 2: Guide to Quality Improvement Methods, 1992.
- Electronic Components Committee (1994), Guide to Total Quality Management (TQM) for CECC-Approved Organizations, Brussels, Belgium: European Committee for Electrotechnical Standardization, CECC 00 806 Issue 1
- System zur Zukunftssicherung: Total Quality Management (TQM), Düsseldorf, Germany: Verein Deutscher Ingenieure, 1996, OCLC 632959402, VDI 5500
- Total Quality and Marketing/Management Tools, Paris, France: AFNOR, 1998, FD X50-680
- Total Quality Management: Guide to Management Principles, Turkish Standards Institution (TSE), 2006, TS 13133

== Legacy ==
Interest in TQM as an academic subject peaked around 1993.

The Federal Quality Institute was shuttered in September 1995 as part of the Clinton administration's efforts to streamline government. The European Centre for Total Quality Management closed in August 2009.

TQM, as a vaguely defined quality management approach, was largely supplanted by the ISO 9000 collection of standards and their formal certification processes in the 1990s. Business interest in quality improvement under the TQM name also faded as Jack Welch's success attracted attention to Six Sigma and Toyota's success attracted attention to lean manufacturing, though the three share many of the same tools, techniques, and significant portions of the same philosophy.

TQM lives on in various national quality awards around the globe.

== See also ==
- Capability Maturity Model Integration CMMI
- Lean manufacturing
- List of national quality awards
- Malcolm Baldrige National Quality Award
- Outline of management
- People Capability Maturity Model
- Zero Defects
