= Quality Digest (magazine) =

Electronic publication about quality management

- Founder: Donald Dewar
- Founded: 1980
- Company: Quality Circle Institute, Inc.
- Country: United States
- Based in: Chico, California
- Language: English
- Website: qualitydigest.com
- ISSN: 1049-8699

Quality Digest (abbreviated as QD) is an online news publication and a former monthly print magazine covering quality management subjects. The content is divided between quality control, metrology, compliance, Six Sigma, and ISO standards and certifications.

== History ==
Known as Quality Circle Digest from 1981 to 1987, QD started as a print magazine by Donald Dewar as a part of the Quality Circle Institute (later also known as QCI International) that he had founded. During the same year that Dewar started QCI, he started touring the United States teaching the principles of quality circles and participative management while promoting the newly launched magazine to American businesses. The first issue was published in 1981. By 1989, the total circulation for Quality Digest magazine reached seventy thousand.

== Content ==
QD publishes writing by experts in the quality management fields, particularly articles about emerging quality initiatives and the quality circle. Pete Robustelli, John Guaspari, H. James Harrington, and Donald J. Wheeler are among those whose work appeared in the publication.

== Criticism ==
When ISO 9000-based standards became a focus for American businesses during the 1990s, Quality Digest was criticized for containing an abundance of ads for services offered by organizations engaged in the business of the ISO certification process.

== See also ==
- Joseph M. Juran
- Kaoru Ishikawa
