= Next operation as customer =

Total quality management approach

In quality engineering, Next Operation as Customer (NOAC) is a total quality management approach whereby all company internal customers and processes are both receivers and providers. In management consulting, the NOAC approach enables the evaluation of processes with internal customers before extending them to external clients.

The term was coined by Kaoru Ishikawa.
