= Quality costs =

In process improvement efforts, quality costs or cost of quality (sometimes abbreviated CoQ or COQ) is a means to quantify the total cost of quality-related efforts and deficiencies. It was first described by Armand V. Feigenbaum in a 1956 Harvard Business Review article.

Prior to its introduction, the general perception was that higher quality requires higher costs, either by buying better materials or machines or by hiring more labor. Furthermore, while cost accounting had evolved to categorize financial transactions into revenues, expenses, and changes in shareholder equity, it had not attempted to categorize costs relevant to quality, which is especially important given that most people involved in manufacturing never set hands on the product. By classifying quality-related entries from a company's general ledger, management and quality practitioners can evaluate investments in quality based on cost improvement and profit enhancement.

== Definitions ==
Feigenbaum defined the following quality cost areas:

Cost area		Description	Examples
Costs of control (Costs of conformance)	Prevention costs	Arise from efforts to keep defects from occurring at all	Quality planning; Statistical process control; Investment in quality-related information systems; Quality training and workforce development; Product-design verification; Systems development and management
Costs of control (Costs of conformance)	Appraisal costs	Arise from detecting defects via inspection, test, audit	Test and inspection of purchased materials; Acceptance testing; Inspection; Testing; Checking labor; Setup for test or inspection; Test and inspection equipment; Quality audits; Field testing
Costs of failure of control (Costs of non-conformance)	Internal failure costs	Arise from defects caught internally and dealt with by discarding or repairing the defective items	Scrap; Rework; Material procurement costs
Costs of failure of control (Costs of non-conformance)	External failure costs	Arise from defects that actually reach customers	Complaints in warranty; Complaints out of warranty; Product service; Product liability; Product recall; Loss of reputation

The central theme of quality improvement is that larger investments in prevention drive even larger savings in quality-related failures and appraisal efforts. Feigenbaum's categorization allows the organization to verify this for itself. When confronted with mounting numbers of defects, organizations typically react by throwing more and more people into inspection roles. But inspection is never completely effective, so appraisal costs stay high as long as the failure costs stay high. The only way out of the predicament is to establish the "right" amount of prevention.

Once categorized, quality costs can serve as a means to measure, analyze, budget, and predict.

Variants of the concept of quality costs include cost of poor quality and categorization based on account type, described by Joseph M. Juran.

Cost area	Examples
Tangible costs—factory accounts	Materials scrapped or junked; Labor and burden on product scrapped or junked; Labor, materials, and burden necessary to effect repairs on salvageable product; Extra operations added because of presence of defectives; Burden arising from excess production capacity necessitated by defectives; Excess inspection costs; Investigation of causes of defects
Tangible costs—sales accounts	Discount on seconds; Customer complaints; Charges to quality guarantee account
Intangible costs	Delays and stoppages caused by defectives; Customer good will; Loss in morale due to friction between departments

ISO 9004 also accounts for "external assurance" quality costs to account for customer– or government–required certifications (e.g., for UL, RoHS, or even ISO 9000 itself).

== Reporting ==
To ensure impartiality, reporting should be performed by the accounting department. Additionally, to make it more understandable to a wider audience, the total cost of quality should be reported as a percent of sales, cost of sales, cost of manufacturing, or for firms in the service industry, cost of operations.

== See also ==
- Activity-based costing
- Gold in the mine
- Project triangle
- Cost of poor quality
