= Kaoru Ishikawa =

Japanese business theorist

- 石川 馨
- Born: July 13, 1915; Tokyo, Japan
- Died: April 16, 1989 (aged 73)
- Education: University of Tokyo
- Known for: Ishikawa diagram, Quality circle
- Awards: Walter A. Shewhart Medal, Order of the Sacred Treasures
- Scientific career
- Fields: quality, chemical engineering
- Workplaces: University of Tokyo, Musashi Institute of Technology

Kaoru Ishikawa (石川 馨, Ishikawa Kaoru; July 13, 1915 – April 16, 1989) was a Japanese organizational theorist and a professor in the engineering faculty at the University of Tokyo who was noted for his quality management innovations. He is considered a key figure in the development of quality initiatives in Japan, particularly the quality circle. He is best known outside Japan for the Ishikawa or cause and effect diagram (also known as the fishbone diagram), often used in the analysis of industrial processes.

== Biography ==
Kaoru Ishikawa was born in Tokyo, the eldest of the eight sons of Ichiro Ishikawa. In 1937, he graduated from the University of Tokyo with an engineering degree in applied chemistry. After college, he worked as a naval technical officer from 1939 to 1941. From 1941 to 1947, Ishikawa worked at the Nissan Liquid Fuel Company. In 1947, Ishikawa started his academic career as an associate professor at the University of Tokyo. He undertook the presidency of the Musashi Institute of Technology in 1978.

In 1949, Ishikawa joined the Japanese Union of Scientists and Engineers (JUSE), an organization developed to promote systematic studies needed to stimulate the nation's economy. After World War II, Japan experienced rapid and sustained economic growth. This was mostly achieved due to the rapid development of their manufacturing and the industrial sectors. At the time before the Japanese Economic Miracle, the United States still perceived Japan as a producer of cheap wind-up toys and poor-quality cameras. It was with the help of Ishikawa's skill at mobilizing large groups of people towards a specific common goal that was largely responsible for Japan's quality-improvement initiatives. He translated, integrated and expanded the management concepts of W. Edwards Deming and Joseph M. Juran into the Japanese system. Ishikawa used this concept to define how continuous improvement (kaizen) can be applied to processes when all variables are known.

After becoming a full professor in the engineering faculty at the University of Tokyo (1960), Ishikawa introduced the concept of quality circles (1962) in conjunction with JUSE. This concept began as an experiment to see what effect the "leading hand" (Gemba-cho) could have on quality. It was a natural extension of these forms of training to all levels of an organization (the top and middle managers having already been trained). Although many companies were invited to participate, only one company at the time, Nippon Telephone & Telegraph, accepted. Quality circles would soon become very popular and form an important link in a company's Total Quality Management system. Ishikawa would write two books on quality circles (QC Circle Koryo and How to Operate QC Circle Activities).

According to Quality Digest, one of his efforts to promote quality were the Annual Quality Control Conference for Top Management (1963) and several books on quality control (the Guide to Quality Control (1968) contained the first published example of a Pareto chart.) He was the chairman of the editorial board of the monthly Statistical Quality Control. Ishikawa was involved in international standardization activities.

1982 saw the development of the Ishikawa diagram, which is used to determine the root causes of a problem.

After Ishikawa died in 1989, Juran delivered this eulogy:

There is so much to be learned by studying how Dr. Ishikawa managed to accomplish so much during a single lifetime. In my observation, he did so by applying his natural gifts in an exemplary way. He was dedicated to serving society rather than serving himself. His manner was modest, and this elicited the cooperation of others. He followed his own teachings by securing facts and subjecting them to rigorous analysis. He was completely sincere, and as a result was trusted completely.

== Contributions to improvement of quality ==
- User-friendly quality control.
- Fishbone cause and effect diagram – Ishikawa diagram.
- Implementation of quality circles.
- Emphasised the internal customer.
- Shared vision.
- Kaizen (continual improvement).
- Next operation as customer (NOAC)

== Awards and recognition ==
- 1972 American Society for Quality's Eugene L. Grant Award
- 1977 Blue Ribbon Medal by the Japanese Government for achievements in industrial standardization
- 1982 Walter A. Shewhart Medal
- 1988 Awarded the Order of the Sacred Treasures, Second Class, by the Japanese government.

== Publications ==
- Ishikawa, Kaoru (1968). Guide to Quality Control. Tokyo: Asian Productivity Organization.
- Ishikawa, Kaoru (1980) [original Japanese ed. 1970]. QC Circle Koryo : General Principles of the QC Circle. Tokyo: QC Circle Headquarters, Union of Japanese Scientists and Engineers.
- Ishikawa, Kaoru (1985). How to Operate QC Circle Activities. Tokyo: QC Circle Headquarters, Union of Japanese Scientists and Engineers.
- Ishikawa, Kaoru (1985) [First published in Japanese 1981]. What is Total Quality Control? The Japanese Way [Originally titled: TQC towa Nanika—Nipponteki Hinshitsu Kanri]. D. J. Lu (trans.). New Jersey: Prentice Hall. ISBN 0-13-952433-9.
- Ishikawa, Kaoru (1990). Introduction to Quality Control. J. H. Loftus (trans.). Tokyo: 3A Corporation. ISBN 4-906224-61-X. OCLC 61341428.

About Kaoru Ishikawa

- Kondo, Yoshio (July 1994). "Kaoru Ishikawa: What He thought and Achieved, A Basis for Further Research". Quality Management Journal. 1 (4): 86–91. doi:10.1080/10686967.1994.11918666. ISSN 1068-6967.
- Watson, Greg (April 2004). "The Legacy Of Ishikawa". Quality Progress. 37 (4): 54–57. ISSN 0033-524X.
- Dewar, Donald L. (May 1988). "A Serious Anomaly: TQC without Quality Circles". Annual Quality Congress, Dallas, TX. 42: 34–38.
- Barik, Prasanta Kumar. (2021). Handbook of Quality Circle. India: Notion Press. ISBN 978-1685545895.
- title=The Japanese Approach to Product Quality |Professor Sasaki and David Hutchins 1980 Pub Pergamon Press | 0-08-028 159-1 |HBK 0-0273-028B 160-5
- title=Quality Circles Handbook | last= Hutchins | first=David (1983)| |Pub PITMAN BOOKS 0–273 02644-5| PBK AND 0-273-02024-2 HBK
- A special tribute to Professor Kaoru Ishikawa 1990 | title= The man and his work | David Hutchins invited author of one chapter| Published by JUSE JAPAN + Special Committee| E 03(5379)1240
- title= Hoshin Kanri – the Strategic Approach to Continuous Improvement | last= Hutchins | first=David | | 2008 | pub – GOWER PRESS 13:9780566087 400
