= Armand V. Feigenbaum =

American quality control expert

- Born: April 6, 1920; New York City, US
- Died: November 13, 2014 (aged 94); Pittsfield, Massachusetts, US
- Education: MIT Sloan School of Management
- Occupations: Engineer and Quality control

Armand Vallin Feigenbaum (April 6, 1920 – November 13, 2014) was an American quality control expert and businessman. He devised the concept of Total Quality Control (TQM), now known as "total quality management".

== Biography ==
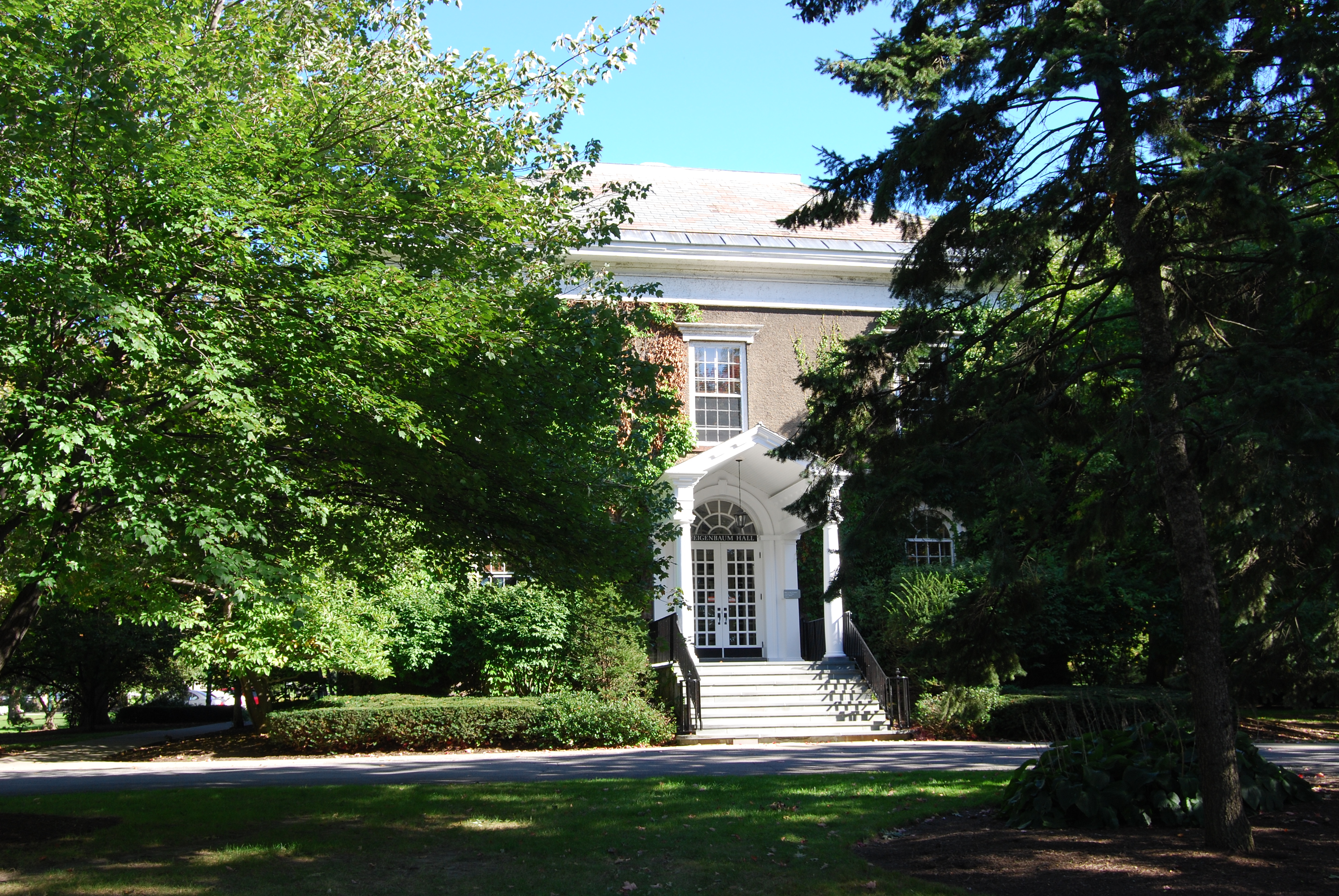
Feigenbaum Hall on the campus of Union College

Feigenbaum, known as “Val”, received a bachelor's degree in industrial administration from Union College, and worked during World War II on aircraft engine design. He earned his master's degree at the MIT Sloan School of Management, and his Ph.D. in Economics was also awarded by MIT. He was Director of Manufacturing Operations at General Electric (1958–1968), and was later the President and CEO of General Systems Company of Pittsfield, Massachusetts, an engineering firm that helps companies define business operating systems. Feigenbaum wrote several books and served as president of the American Society for Quality (1961–1963). He worked closely with his brother, Donald S. Feigenbaum.

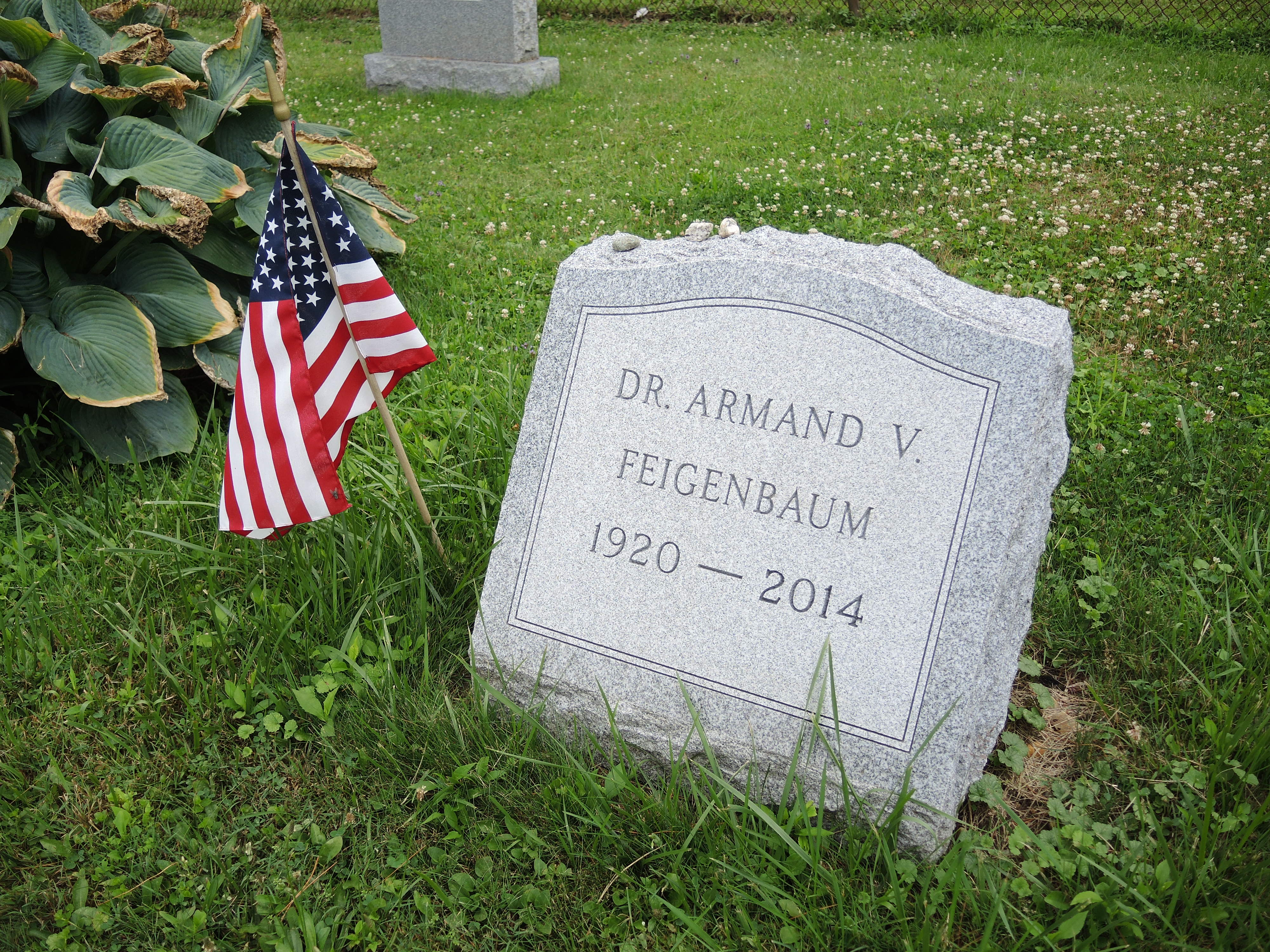
Gravestone in the Anshe Amunim section of Pittsfield Cemetery

He died on November 13, 2014, at the age of 94.

== Key ideas ==
Val Feigenbaum's significant contributions to the development of quality in business management were to link established ideas about quality into a more systematic discipline and to define total quality in a workable and practical way.

His contributions to the quality body of knowledge include:

- Seeing Total Quality Control as "an effective system for integrating the quality development, quality maintenance, and quality improvement efforts of the various groups in an organization so as to enable production and service at the most economical levels which allow full customer satisfaction".
- The concept of a "hidden" plant or factory, popularised in the 1970s: the idea that so much extra work is performed in correcting mistakes that there is effectively a hidden plant within any factory, potentially 20-40% of the total capacity.
- Accountability for quality: because quality is everybody's job, it may become nobody's job. Central to this idea is that quality must be actively managed and have visibility at the highest levels of management.
- The concept of quality cost: the cost of achieving quality plus the cost of absence of quality.
- The time lag between the introduction of total quality initiatives inside the major companies within a country and their observed economic impact: for example, Japanese companies introduced quality initiatives in the 1950s which took effect in the Japanese economy in the 1970s and likewise the United States' quality initiatives from the 1980's saw an economic impact in the 1990s.
- Quality is neither a department, nor a technique nor a philosophy. It is a fundamental way of managing.

== Bibliography ==
- Feigenbaum, A V (1945), Quality control: principles, practice and administration; an industrial management tool for improving product quality and design and for reducing operating costs and losses, McGraw-Hill industrial organization and management series, New York, McGraw-Hill, OCLC 18582947
- Feigenbaum, Armand Vallin (1961), Total Quality Control, New York, McGraw-Hill, OCLC 250573852
- Feigenbaum, A V; Feigenbaum, Donald S (2003), The power of management capital : utilizing the new drivers of innovation, profitability, and growth in a demanding global economy, McGraw-Hill, ISBN 978-0-07-021733-1, OCLC 52165584
- Feigenbaum, A V; Feigenbaum, Donald S (2009), The power of management innovation : 24 keys for sustaining and accelerating business growth and profitability, McGraw-Hill mighty manager handbooks., McGraw-Hill, ISBN 978-0-07-162578-4, OCLC 277205991
