= Inspection in manufacturing =

Inspection in manufacturing is conducting inspection during the production process. This approach of inspection helps to control the quality of products by helping to fix the sources of defects immediately after they are detected, and it is useful for any factory that wants to improve productivity, reduce defect rates, and reduce re-work and waste.

== Positive impact ==
- Reduces end-line defects
- Saves time and efforts of final inspection
- Helps to fix the problems at the outset, and prevents common mistakes being made repeatedly
- Helps to ensure quality of the products of a production line

== See also ==
- Quality control
- Good manufacturing practice
