= Quality Management Maturity Grid =

Tool to measure the maturity of an organization's quality management processed

The Quality Management Maturity Grid (QMMG) is an organizational maturity matrix conceived by Philip B. Crosby first published in his book Quality is Free in 1979. The QMMG is used by a business or organization as a benchmark of how mature their processes are, and how well they are embedded in their culture, with respect to service or product quality management.

The QMMG is credited with being the precursor maturity model for the Capability Maturity Model (CMM) created a decade later that also has five levels of maturity.

The Quality Management Maturity Grid describes 5 maturity levels through which an organization or business will go through:

1. Uncertainty
2. Awakening
3. Enlightenment
4. Wisdom
5. Certainty

== See also ==
- Capability Maturity Model Integration
- Capability Maturity Model
