= Donald J. Wheeler =

American author and statistician

Donald J. Wheeler is an American author, statistician and expert in quality control.

Wheeler graduated from the University of Texas in 1966 and holds M.S. and Ph.D. degrees in statistics from Southern Methodist University. From 1970 to 1982 he taught in the Statistics Department at the University of Tennessee, where he was an associate professor. Since 1982 he has worked as a consultant. He is the author of 22 textbooks. His books have been translated into five languages and are in use in over 40 countries. He has been invited to contribute to two state-of-the-art anthologies, and has had articles published in 16 refereed journals. He is a fellow of both the American Statistical Association and American Society for Quality. He was awarded the 2010 Deming Medal by the American Society for Quality.

Wheeler has been a monthly columnist for both Quality Digest and Quality magazine. He has conducted over 1000 seminars for over 250 companies and organizations in 17 countries on five continents, and has had students come from 30 countries to attend his seminars in the United States.
