= Gold in the mine =

Metaphor

Gold in the mine is a metaphor for the potential savings in quality improvement efforts. It is essentially a restatement of the Pareto principle in the context of quality costs; digging in the right place can produce great savings, though investigating every possible opportunity is not economically feasible.
