= Kent State University College of Podiatric Medicine =

University medical school in Ohio, US

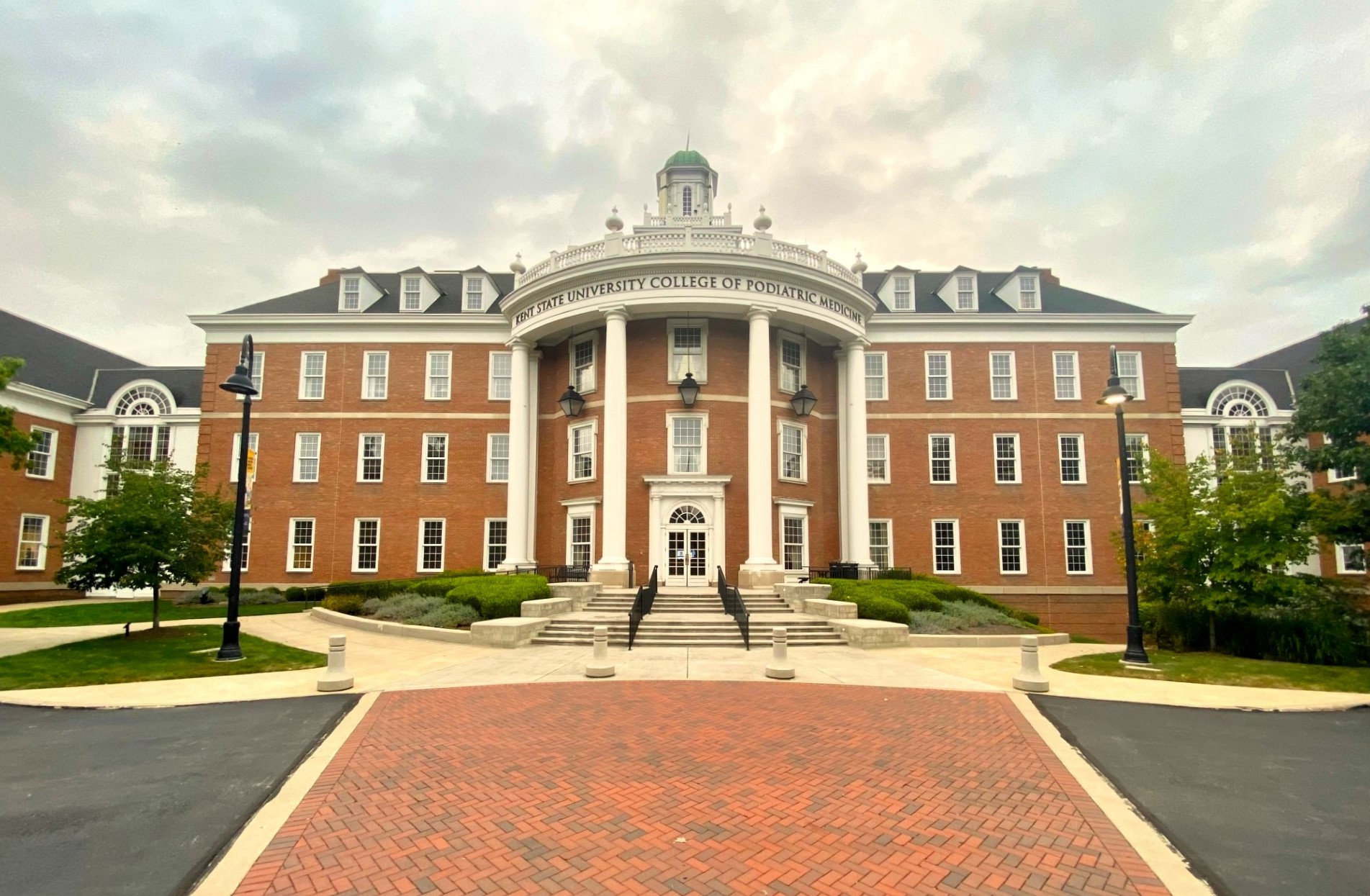
- Independence Campus
- Motto: Pedestris Scientiae Porta
- Type: Public university
- Established: 1916
- Dean: Allan M. Boike
- Faculty: 40+
- Students: 425
- Location: Independence, Ohio, United States; 41°24′02″N 81°38′53″W
- Campus: Suburban 27 acres
- Website: www.kent.edu/cpm

Kent State University College of Podiatric Medicine (KSUCPM), is the graduate podiatric medical school of Kent State University (KSU). As of 2022, it is the only fully public podiatry medical school in the U.S. The college is located in Independence, Ohio, south of Cleveland, approximately 30 miles (48 km) from the main KSU campus in Kent. Established in 1916, the college, formerly the Ohio College of Podiatric Medicine, was among the first in the nation to offer a program in podiatric medicine and surgery. The 122,000-square-foot (11,300 m^{2}) facility operates as a regional KSU facility in podiatric medical education.

The college, which was formerly a private graduate medical institution, has graduated over 7,000 podiatric physicians and surgeons throughout its history. It is a member of The American Association of Colleges of Podiatric Medicine (AACPM), and is accredited by the Council on Podiatric Medical Education (CPME). All graduates receive the degree Doctor of Podiatric Medicine (DPM).

== History ==
The college began as The Ohio College of Chiropody in 1916, and was located in Euclid Avenue's Republic Building until 1922. Its facility consisted of a lecture hall, a laboratory with one microscope, six Bunsen burners, and eight chairs for patients. The term chiropody is the former name of the profession of podiatry. The college then relocated to its original University Circle location in 1931, where a new medical college was constructed at 2057 Cornell Road in Cleveland. This was the first structure built solely for the purpose of chiropody/podiatry in the country. The college remained at that location for over 50 years, until its demolition due to continued expansion of Case medical center. This building housed full chemistry, histology, pathology and bacteriology labs as well as 4 lecture halls (100 seat capacity), library, clinic and operating suite. In 1934, Harmolin Hall was built which housed the Cleveland Foot Clinic (40 chair clinic), X-ray department, offices, dissection laboratory and gymnasium. By 1976, the college bought, and moved into, the Carnegie Medical Building at 10515 Carnegie Avenue near University Circle. This building, one of Cleveland's last remaining art deco masterpieces, was a comprehensive medical college giving its students more room and resources for clinical, scientific, and research based education. In 1990 the Cleveland Foot and Ankle Clinic was built on the campus and it contributed to the innovative curriculum and clinical opportunities for OCPM's students. In the summer of 2007, OCPM moved for the last time. It was presented a grant from the Cleveland Clinic to purchase and renovate its new 122,000-square-foot (11,300 m^{2}) facility which is located 10 miles (16 km) south of Cleveland's University Circle in Independence, Ohio. The college-run Cleveland Foot and Ankle Clinic was moved to two locations: Midtown Cleveland on Euclid Avenue between the E. 40th and E. 55th blocks, and a clinic at the Independence campus. The Cleveland Foot and Ankle Clinic physicians also serve patients at the DeWeese Health Center at Kent State University in Kent, Ohio.

=== Sports ===
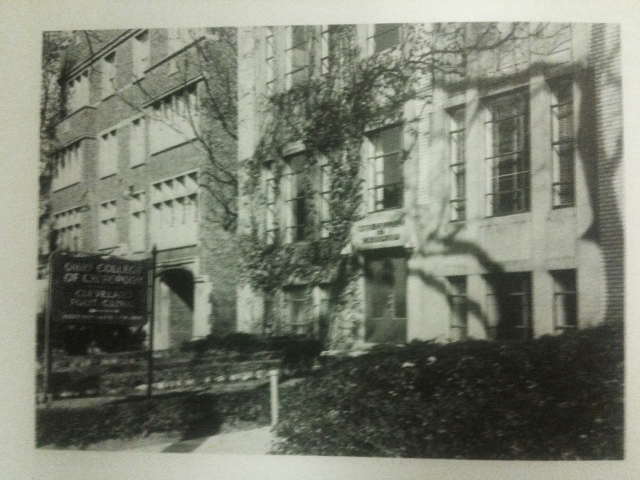
Ohio College of Chiropody, University Circle in Cleveland

The college participated in at least two varsity men's sports during its early years of operation. The Ohio College of Chiropody competed against Youngstown University and Case Institute in fencing during the early 1930s.

The college also participated in Men's basketball as Ohio Chiropody from 1929 to 1941. The Chiropodists competed in regular season play against NCAA members such as: Fenn College, Ohio University Bowling Green State University, Youngstown University, Slippery Rock University, Duquesne University, and NCAA/NAIA teams: Thiel College, Waynesburg University, Adrian College, Defiance College, Mount Union College, Heidelberg College.

Based on material available regarding the teams that Ohio Chiropody played, it is likely that the college competed mainly among the Ohio Athletic Conference, Michigan Intercollegiate Athletic Association and West Virginia Intercollegiate Athletic Conference as an unaffiliated team neither in the NCAA or NAIA. The past and current members of Presidents' Athletic Conference (founded in 1955) are also listed in archival material as having competed against Ohio Chiropody.

Ohio Chiropody NCAA Basketball ended in February 1941 when two Chiropody athletes were killed in an automobile crash en route to West Virginia to play the West Liberty University Hilltoppers. A third student, Ted Rosser, was injured in the crash but survived. Rosser was a freshman transfer student from the University of Pittsburgh Panthers basketball team. The college decided to suspend the remaining games of the '41 season, and they subsequently withdrew from further intercollegiate NCAA sports.

=== Educational advances ===
At its inception, the only admission requirement to the college was a high school diploma. The original course of study was 8 months in length including night classes, and the degree granted was the Doctor of Surgical Chiropody (D.S.C.). Along with the decades and successive physical expansion of the college came an increase in academic standards. In 1932, the curriculum was expanded to 3 years of full-time study, as the field of chiropody was expanding tremendously with the opening of other chiropody schools around the country. In 1938 the college began requiring applications to have at least one year of full-time study in the liberal arts or sciences from an accredited university prior to being admitted and a decade later the D.S.C. curriculum was extended to a full 4 years of study. By the middle of the century, the American Podiatric Medical Association's Council on Podiatric Medical Education standardized the curricula and entrance requirements for all podiatric schools, and replaced the term chiropody with podiatry to reflect the increase in training. The college became the Ohio College of Podiatry in 1963, and stated that applicants must take at least 60 credits of undergraduate work before applying, however preferred bachelor's degree. For a short time, the graduates were granted the degrees Doctor of Podiatry (D.P.). By 1969, the field was reorganized for the last time, and all schools and colleges became institutions of podiatric medicine, and thus the college became the Ohio College of Podiatric Medicine and granted the D.P.M.

=== Presidents ===
- Lester E. Siemon, 1916–1943
- Max S. Harmolin, 1943–1952
- Bernhardt C. Egerter, 1952–1966
- Max M. Pomerantz, 1966–1972
- Abe Rubin, D1972-1984
- Thomas V. Melillo, 1984–2013

=== Deans ===
- Bryan D. Caldwell, Interim Dean, 2013 - June 30, 2014
- Allan M. Boike, July 1, 2014 – July 2026
- Mark A. Hardy, Interim Dean, July 2026 – present

=== Merger with Kent State University ===
On November 1, 2011, a joint statement was released from the college and Kent State University stating that the two institutions would be merging, but no timeline was made available at the time. On December 15, 2011, Kent State University announced that its Board of Trustees passed a resolution to officially acquire OCPM within six months of the January 1, 2012. The college was renamed Kent State University College of Podiatric Medicine. The merger between the two institutions provided students at the college of podiatric medicine the opportunity to complete additional degrees such as Masters in Public Health and Ph.D. programs in various sciences, while enrolled in the D.P.M. program.

== Academics ==
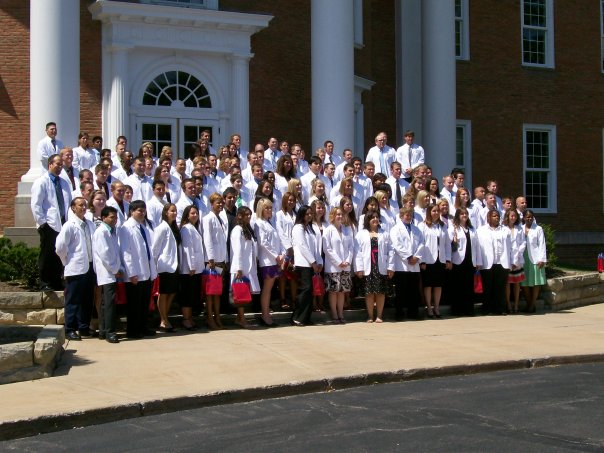
OCPM class of 2012.

The Kent State University College of Podiatric Medicine is a single purpose, public, nonprofit institution that graduates Doctors of Podiatric Medicine. The authority to confer the DPM degree is granted to the college by the Ohio Board of Regents. The curriculum follows the Allopathic medical education model, but with an emphasis on the lower extremity, and is divided into basic science and clinical science components.

=== Basic sciences ===
The first year of the four year curriculum is composed of courses designed to provide students with a mastery of the normal structure and function of the human body. Basic science faculty are from both the college itself and Case Western Reserve University. In order to achieve this, didactic and hands on laboratory courses are combined to give students a solid foundation in fields such as biochemistry, histology, gross anatomy, neurobiology and physiology. Coursework during the second year focuses more on both variations and abnormalities that affect the organ systems of the human body, and ways to recognize and treat such pathology. Courses that cover this material include systems pathology, microbiology/immunology, and pharmacology. The first two years of study account for 95 of the credits required for graduation.

=== Clinical sciences ===
The third year marks the beginning of the clinical education and includes 24 credits of classroom/laboratory courses such as dermatology, traumatology, general medicine, neurology, women's health, behavioral medicine, radiology, and of course podiatric medicine and podiatric surgery, among others. Third year also includes rotations in departments such as podiatric medicine and surgery, wound care/plastic surgery, vascular surgery, trauma surgery, radiology, internal medicine, and emergency medicine to name a few. These clinical rotations are through the college's affiliations with:

==== Affiliations ====
- The college-operated Cleveland Foot and Ankle Clinics
- Cleveland Department of Veterans Affairs Medical Center, Division of Podiatric Medicine and Surgery
- Cleveland Clinic Foundation hospitals
- University Hospitals of Cleveland- Richmond Medical Center
- St. Vincent Charity Hospital, Department of Internal Medicine
- MetroHealth Cleveland Departments of Vascular, Plastic and General Surgery
- South Pointe Hospital Departments of Emergency Medicine and Wound Care
- Northeast Ohio Neighborhood Community Health Clinics

==== Fourth year externships ====
During the fourth and final year, students set out on up to six (6) 4-week externships in podiatric medicine and surgery at hospitals across the country. These off campus externships provide extensive clinical and surgery exposure that will be necessary entrance into Podiatric Medicine and Surgery Residencies (Three year post-graduate medical education required for licensure and board certification).

== Facilities ==
The campus is a 27-acre (11 ha) site in the Cleveland suburb of Independence, adjacent to the interchange of Interstates 77 and 480. The college has the following facilities:

- Anatomy lab
  - Sky-Eye overhead camera which transmits live dissection to plasma TVs over each cadaver table
  - Full gross cadaver dissection with one human cadaver for a group of three-four students
  - Touch-screen Windows-based computers with Internet accessibility at each lab station
- Podiatric medical skills lab
- Histology and Microbiology labs
  - Microscopes, fume hoods, heat plates, refrigeration, and full complement of reagents and substrate material necessary for bacteriological and mycological examination
- Simulated Patients' learning center
  - Overhead camera and microphone in each simulated exam room records student progress throughout the Physical Examination course-study
  - equipped with medical manikins that test students on real-life medical emergencies
- Three 150-seat lecture halls equipped with Smart Technology
  - where each lecture is audio and video recorded for later study
- Powerstep Research Laboratory
- Norma and Morton Siedman Memorial Library
  - with media center, quiet study areas, and a collection of over 15,000 medical books and publications, 110 subscribed print journals, and 350 online e-journals.
- Radiology Department
  - Equipped with viewing boxes and largest educational collection of radiographic pathology in the State of Ohio

== Campus culture ==
=== Intramural sports ===
KSUCPM and student organizations sponsor a number of athletic endeavors depending on the interest of the student body. Special athletic competitions include:

- golf
- flag football
- volleyball
- basketball (KSUCPM participates every spring in a basketball tournament with the other colleges of podiatric medicine)
- softball
- soccer

=== Student organizations ===
KSUCPM offers a number of student organizations and clubs to serve the student population. - Ohio Podiatric Medical Student Association (OPMSA) - American Association of Women in Podiatry (AAWP) - American College of Foot and Ankle Surgeons (ACFAS) - American Society of Podiatric Surgeons (ASPS) - The American College of Podiatric Medicine (ACPM) - American Podiatric Medical Students' Association (APMSA) - American College of Foot and Ankle Pediatrics (ACFAP) - American Society of Podiatric Dermatology (ASPD) - Podiatric Association for Diabetes (PAD) - American Association of Podiatric Sports Medicine (AAPSM) - Student National Podiatric Medical Association (SNPMA) - American Society of Forensic Podiatry (ASFP) - Kappa Tau Epsilon (KTE) - Pi Delta National Honor Society - Beta Chapter - Student Organized Community Service (SOCS) - KSUCPM Women's Basketball Club - KSUCPM Men's Basketball Club - KSUCPM Soccer Club - The Rec & Running Club

== Notable alumni ==
- Philip B. Crosby, quality expert, graduated in 1950.
- James Hummitzsch Flynn, bronze medalist, 1948 Summer Olympics in London, Fencing (Men's team sabre)
