= Philip B. Crosby =

American businessman and author

Phil Crosby
- Born: Philip Bayard Crosby; June 18, 1926; Wheeling, West Virginia, US
- Died: August 18, 2001 (aged 75); Asheville, North Carolina, US
- Resting place: Palm Cemetery, Winter Park, Florida
- Education: 1950
- Alma mater: Ohio College of Podiatric Medicine
- Occupation: Quality consultant
- Years active: 1952 – 1999
- Employer(s): The Martin Company, ITT Corporation, Philip Crosby Associates
- Known for: Philosophies of Quality management, Zero Defects, Quality Management Maturity Grid
- Notable work: Quality Is Free (1979)
- Spouse: Peggy
- Children: 3

Philip Bayard "Phil" Crosby (June 18, 1926 – August 18, 2001) was an American businessman and author who contributed to management theory and quality management practices.

Crosby initiated the Zero Defects program at the Martin Company. As the quality control manager of the Pershing missile program, Crosby was credited with a 25 percent reduction in the overall rejection rate and a 30 percent reduction in scrap costs.

== Early life and career ==
Crosby was born in Wheeling, West Virginia, in 1926. He served in the Navy during World War II and again during the Korean War. In between, he earned a degree from the Ohio College of Podiatric Medicine.

His first job in the field of quality was that of test technician in the quality department at Crosley Corporation in Richmond, Indiana, beginning in 1952. He left for a better-paying position as reliability engineer at Bendix Corporation in Mishawaka, Indiana in 1955, working on the RIM-8 Talos missile. He left after less than two years to become senior quality engineer at The Martin Company's new Orlando, Florida organization to develop the Pershing missile. There he developed the Zero Defects concept. He eventually rose to become department head before leaving for ITT Corporation in 1965 to become director of quality.

In 1979, Crosby started the management consulting company Philip Crosby Associates, Inc. This consulting group provided educational courses in quality management both at their headquarters in Winter Park, Florida, and at eight foreign locations.

== Quality is Free ==
In 1979, Crosby published his first business book, Quality Is Free, with the subtitle The Art of Making Quality Certain. This book gained prominence during a critical period for North American industry, when, between the late 1970s and early 1980s, North American manufacturers were losing market share to Japanese products, which were distinguished by their superior quality.

Crosby's response to this quality crisis was based on the principle of "doing it right the first time" (DIRFT). This approach was structured around four key principles:

Definition of quality: Quality is defined as conformance to requirements, with requirements encompassing both product specifications and customer expectations. Quality system: The quality management system should be based on defect prevention, rather than relying on inspection or correction after the fact. Performance standard: The goal in terms of quality should be to achieve zero defects, ensuring that all products meet specified requirements. Measurement of quality: Quality is measured by the cost of nonconformance, i.e., the costs associated with failing to meet requirements. Crosby argued that implementing strong quality management principles would enable organizations to achieve significant savings that far exceed the costs of establishing a robust quality system. According to Crosby, "quality is free" because it is more cost-effective to do things right the first time than to incur additional expenses from rework, repairs and restoring customer confidence.

Crosby's quality management principles have been adopted by other departments and groups in business, most notably in the HR/Safety divisions of construction and petrochemical companies. One result is where these companies used to plan on one death for every million dollars spent on a project, they now routinely complete millions of man-hours of work without a reportable injury. ('Defect') {Chart showing sudden reduction in death beginning after Quality is Free was published} https://substackcdn.com/image/fetch/$s_!G7n2!,f_auto,q_auto:good,fl_progressive:steep/https%3A%2F%2Fsubstack-post-media.s3.amazonaws.com%2Fpublic%2Fimages%2F6df97af0-ce38-4f3f-9896-6722bd880dca_562x399.png

== Works ==
- Crosby, Philip (1967). Cutting the cost of quality. Boston, Industrial Education Institute. OCLC 616899. Archived from the original on July 6, 2013.
- —— (1969). The strategy of situation management. Boston, Industrial Education Institute. OCLC 13761.
- —— (1979). Quality is Free. New York: McGraw-Hill. ISBN 0-07-014512-1.
- —— (1981). The Art of Getting Your Own Sweet Way. McGraw-Hill. ISBN 0-07-014527-X.
- —— (1984). Quality Without Tears. New York: McGraw-Hill. ISBN 0-07-014511-3.
- —— (1986). Running things. New York: McGraw-Hill. ISBN 0-07-014513-X.
- —— (1988). The Eternally Successful Organization. New York: McGraw-Hill. ISBN 0-07-014533-4.
- —— (1989). Let's talk quality. New York: McGraw-Hill. ISBN 0-07-014565-2.
- —— (1990). Leading, the art of becoming an executive. New York: McGraw-Hill. ISBN 0-07-014567-9.
- —— (1994). Completeness: Quality for the 21st Century. Plume. ISBN 0-452-27024-3.
- —— (1995). Philip Crosby's Reflections on Quality. McGraw-Hill. ISBN 0-07-014525-3.
- —— (1996). Quality is still free: Making Quality Certain in Uncertain Times. McGraw-Hill. ISBN 0-07-014532-6.
- —— (1997). The Absolutes of Leadership (Warren Bennis Executive Briefing). Jossey-Bass. ISBN 0-7879-0942-4.
- —— (1999). Quality and Me: Lessons from an Evolving Life. Jossey-Bass. ISBN 0-7879-4702-4.
