= Quality engineering =

Principles and practice of product and service quality assurance and control

Quality engineering is the discipline of engineering concerned with the principles and practice of product and service quality assurance and control. In software development, it is the management, development, operation and maintenance of IT systems and enterprise architectures with high quality standard.

== Description ==
Quality engineering is the discipline of engineering that creates and implements strategies for quality assurance in product development and production as well as software development.

Quality Engineers focus on optimizing product quality which W. Edwards Deming defined as:

$$\text{Quality} = \frac{\text{Results of work efforts}}{\text{Total costs}}$$

Quality engineering body of knowledge includes:

- Management and leadership
- The quality system
- Elements of a quality system
- Product and process design
- Classification of quality characteristics
- Design inputs and review
- Design verification
- Reliability and maintainability
- Product and process control
- Continuous improvement
- Quality control tools
- Quality management and planning tools
- Continuous improvement techniques
- Corrective action
- Preventive action
- Statistical process control (SPC)
- Risk management

== Roles ==
Auditor: Quality engineers may be responsible for auditing their own companies or their suppliers for compliance to international quality standards such as ISO9000 and AS9100. They may also be independent auditors under an auditing body.

Process quality: Quality engineers may be tasked with value stream mapping and statistical process control to determine if a process is likely to produce a defective product. They may create inspection plans and criteria to ensure defective parts are detected prior to completion.

Supplier quality: Quality engineers may be responsible for auditing suppliers or performing root cause and corrective action at their facility or overseeing such activity to prevent the delivery of defective products.

== Software ==
IT services are increasingly interlinked in workflows across platform boundaries, device and organisational boundaries, for example in cyber-physical systems, business-to-business workflows or when using cloud services. In such contexts, quality engineering facilitates the necessary all-embracing consideration of quality attributes.

In such contexts an "end-to-end" view of quality from management to operation is vital. Quality engineering integrates methods and tools from enterprise architecture-management, Software product management, IT service management, software engineering and systems engineering, and from software quality management and information security management. This means that quality engineering goes beyond the classic disciplines of software engineering, information security management or software product management since it integrates management issues (such as business and IT strategy, risk management, business process views, knowledge and information management, operative performance management), design considerations (including the software development process, requirements analysis, software testing) and operative considerations (such as configuration, monitoring, IT service management). In many of the fields where it is used, quality engineering is closely linked to compliance with legal and business requirements, contractual obligations and standards. As far as quality attributes are concerned, reliability, security and safety of IT services play a predominant role.

In quality engineering, quality objectives are implemented in a collaborative process. This process requires the interaction of largely independent actors whose knowledge is based on different sources of information.

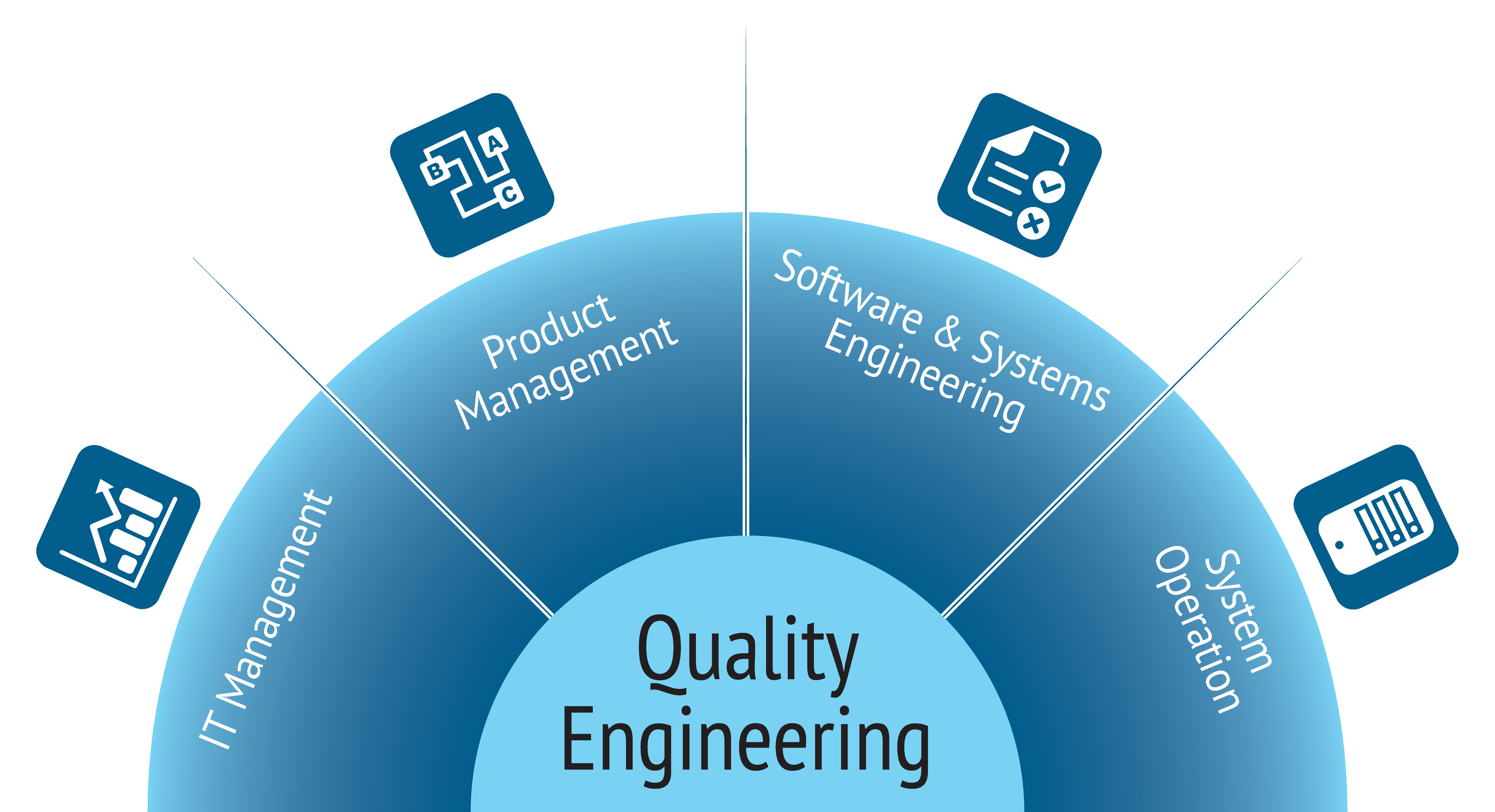
Quality engineering

== Quality objectives ==
Quality objectives describe basic requirements for software quality. In quality engineering they often address the quality attributes of availability, security, safety, reliability and performance. With the help of quality models like ISO/IEC 25000 and methods like the Goal Question Metric approach it is possible to attribute metrics to quality objectives. This allows measuring the degree of attainment of quality objectives. This is a key component of the quality engineering process and, at the same time, is a prerequisite for its continuous monitoring and control. To ensure effective and efficient measuring of quality objectives the integration of core numbers, which were identified manually (e.g. by expert estimates or reviews), and automatically identified metrics (e.g. by statistical analysis of source codes or automated regression tests) as a basis for decision-making is favourable.

Composite indicators are increasingly used in quality engineering to summarize various software quality metrics into a single score. The Quality Engineering Score (QE Score) is one such example, combining multiple quality dimensions into a continuously updated indicator to support monitoring and decision-making. The approach is publicly documented and has been presented at professional conferences such as the French Software Testing Days.

== Actors ==
The end-to-end quality management approach to quality engineering requires numerous actors with different responsibilities and tasks, different expertise and involvement in the organisation.

Different roles involved in quality engineering:

- Business architect,
- IT architect,
- Security officer,
- Requirements engineer,
- Software quality manager,
- Test manager,
- Project manager,
- Product manager and
- Security architect.

Typically, these roles are distributed over geographic and organisational boundaries. Therefore, appropriate measures need to be taken to coordinate the heterogeneous tasks of the various roles in quality engineering and to consolidate and synchronize the data and information necessary to fulfill the tasks, and make them available to each actor in an appropriate form.

== Knowledge management ==
Knowledge management plays an important part in quality engineering. The quality engineering knowledge base comprises manifold structured and unstructured data, ranging from code repositories via requirements specifications, standards, test reports and enterprise architecture models to system configurations and runtime logs. Software and system models play an important role in mapping this knowledge. The data of the quality engineering knowledge base are generated, processed and made available both manually as well as tool-based in a geographically, organisationally and technically distributed context. Of prime importance is the focus on quality assurance tasks, early recognition of risks, and appropriate support for the collaboration of actors.

This results in the following requirements for a quality engineering knowledge base:

- Knowledge is available in a quality as required. Important quality criteria include that knowledge is consistent and up-to-date as well as complete and adequate in terms of granularity in relation to the tasks of the appropriate actors.
- Knowledge is interconnected and traceable in order to support interaction between the actors and to facilitate analysis of data. Such traceability relates not only to interconnectedness of data across different levels of abstraction (e.g. connection of requirements with the services realizing them) but also to their traceability over time periods, which is only possible if appropriate versioning concepts exist. Data can be interconnected both manually as well as (semi-) automatically.
- Information has to be available in a form that is consistent with the domain knowledge of the appropriate actors. Therefore, the knowledge base has to provide adequate mechanisms for information transformation (e.g. aggregation) and visualization. The RACI concept is an example of an appropriate model for assigning actors to information in a quality engineering knowledge base.
- In contexts, where actors from different organisations or levels interact with each other, the quality engineering knowledge base has to provide mechanisms for ensuring confidentiality and integrity.
- Quality engineering knowledge bases offer a whole range of possibilities for analysis and finding information in order to support quality control tasks of actors.

== Collaborative processes ==
The quality engineering process comprises all tasks carried out manually and in a (semi-)automated way to identify, fulfil and measure any quality features in a chosen context. The process is a highly collaborative one in the sense that it requires interaction of actors, widely acting independently from each other.

The quality engineering process has to integrate any existing sub-processes that may comprise highly structured processes such as IT service management and processes with limited structure such as agile software development. Another important aspect is change-driven procedure, where change events, such as changed requirements are dealt with in the local context of information and actors affected by such change. A pre-requisite for this is methods and tools, which support change propagation and change handling.

The objective of an efficient quality engineering process is the coordination of automated and manual quality assurance tasks. Code review or elicitation of quality objectives are examples of manual tasks, while regression tests and the collection of code metrics are examples for automatically performed tasks. The quality engineering process (or its sub-processes) can be supported by tools such as ticketing systems or security management tools.

== See also ==
- Index of quality engineering articles
- Seven Basic Tools of Quality
- Engineering management
- Manufacturing engineering
- Mission assurance
- Systems engineering
- W. Edwards Deming

Associations

- American Society for Quality
- INFORMS
- Institute of Industrial Engineers
