= Pareto chart =

Type of chart

A Pareto chart of titanium investment casting defects

A Pareto chart is a type of chart that contains both bars and a line graph, where individual values are represented in descending order by bars, and the cumulative total is represented by the line. The chart is named for the Pareto principle, which, in turn, derives its name from Vilfredo Pareto, a noted Italian economist. Its purpose is to assess the most frequently occurring defects by category.

== Description ==
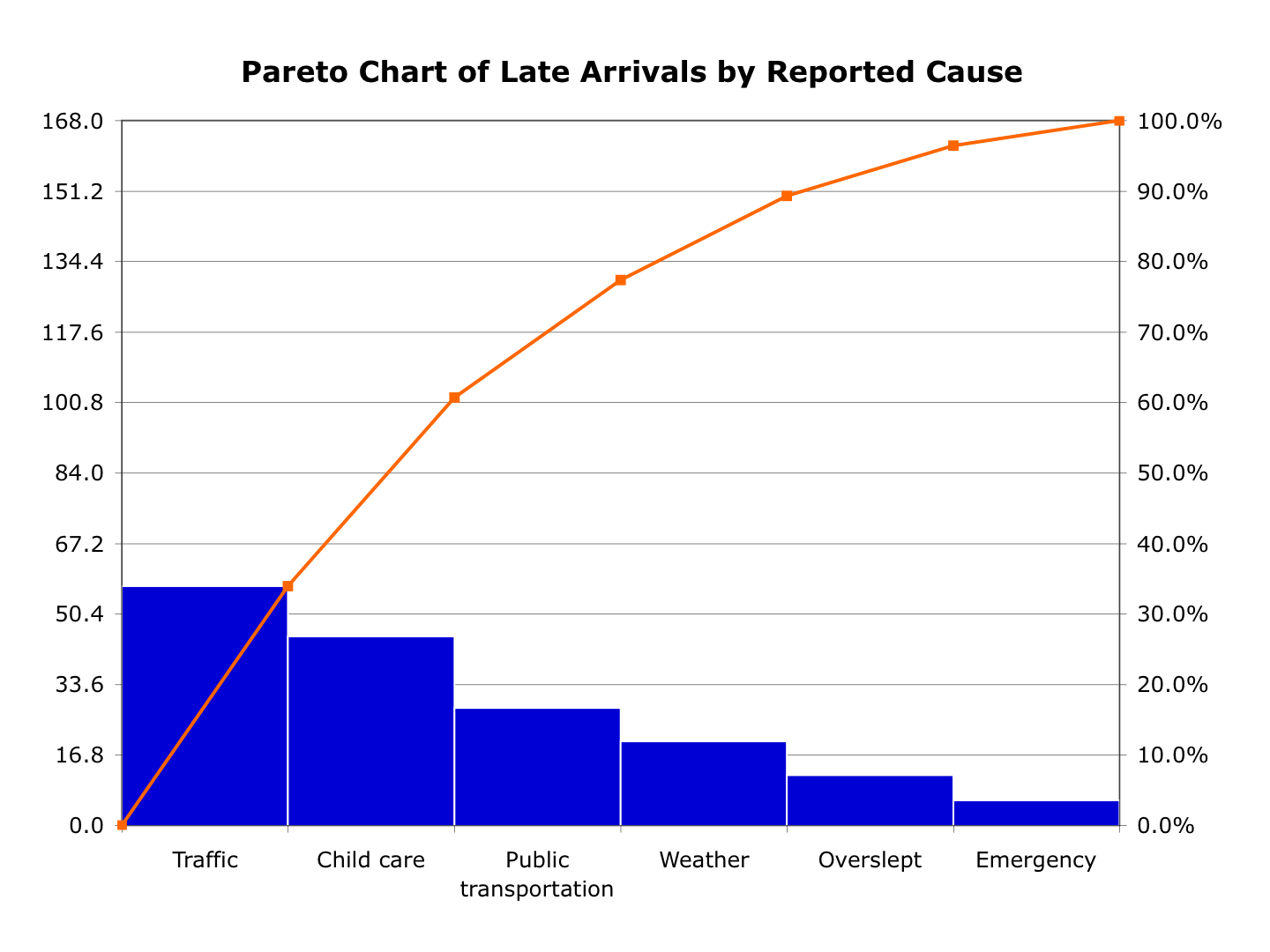
Simple example of a Pareto chart using hypothetical data showing the relative frequency of reasons for arriving late at work

The left vertical axis is the frequency of occurrence, but it can alternatively represent cost or another important unit of measure. The right vertical axis is the cumulative percentage of the total number of occurrences, total cost, or total of the particular unit of measure. Because the values are in decreasing order, the cumulative function is a concave function. To take the example below, in order to lower the amount of late arrivals by 78%, it is sufficient to solve the first three issues.

The Pareto Chart demonstrates a power law relationship between the rank of a quality issue and that issue's contribution to cost. This means one can find a linear relationship on a log-log plot.

The purpose of the Pareto chart is to highlight the most important among a (typically large) set of factors. In quality control, Pareto charts are useful to find the defects to prioritize in order to observe the greatest overall improvement. It often represents the most common sources of defects, the highest occurring type of defect, or the most frequent reasons for customer complaints, and so on. Wilkinson (2006) devised an algorithm for producing statistically based acceptance limits (similar to confidence intervals) for each bar in the Pareto chart.

These charts can be generated by simple spreadsheet programs, specialized statistical software tools, and online quality charts generators.

The Pareto chart is one of the seven basic tools of quality control.

== See also ==
- Control chart
- Histogram
- Cumulative distribution function (CDF)
- Pareto analysis
- Pareto principle
- Statistical process control (SPC)
