= Joseph M. Juran =

Romanian-American engineer (1904–2008)

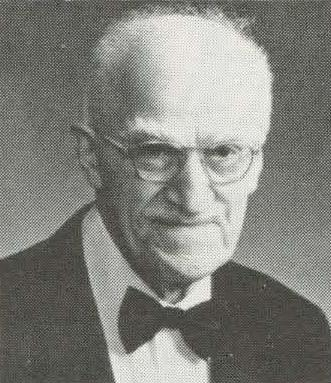
- Juran circa 1987
- Born: Joseph Moses Juran; December 24, 1904; Brăila, Kingdom of Romania
- Died: February 28, 2008 (aged 103); Rye, New York, U.S.
- Occupations: Engineer and management consultant
- Spouse: Sadie Shapiro (m. 1926)
- Children: 4 (2 deceased)

Joseph Moses Juran (December 24, 1904 – February 28, 2008) was a Romanian-born American engineer, management consultant and author. He was an advocate for quality and quality management and wrote several books on the topics. He was the brother of Academy Award winner Nathan Juran.

== Early life ==
Juran was born in Brăila, Kingdom of Romania, one of six children born to Gitel and Jakob Juran; they later lived in Gura Humorului. His family was Jewish and as part of the Jewish community in Romania, were subjected to oppression by the authorities and their Romanian gentile neighbors. Escaping antisemitism, his father emigrated to the United States in 1909 with the rest of the family following in 1912. The Juran family settled in Minneapolis, Minnesota. In deciding to leave Romania the family avoided becoming victims of The Holocaust, as most of the Jews of Gura Humorului were detained and transported to Nazi concentration camps.

Juran had three sisters and two brothers. Rebecca (Betty), Charlotte and Minerva, who earned a doctoral degree and had a career in education, film and art director Nathan Juran and Rudolph (Rudy) the founder of a municipal bond company.

He attended Minneapolis South High School where he excelled, especially in mathematics. He graduated from high school in 1920. He was a chess champion at an early age, and later was dominant in chess at Western Electric. He graduated from the University of Minnesota with a bachelor's degree in electrical engineering.

In 1924, Juran joined Western Electric's Hawthorne Works where his first job was troubleshooting in the Complaint Department. In 1925, Bell Labs proposed that Hawthorne Works personnel be trained in its newly developed statistical sampling and control chart techniques. Juran was chosen to join the Inspection Statistical Department, a small group of engineers charged with applying and disseminating Bell Labs' statistical quality control innovations. This visible position in the company accelerated Juran's career.

== Department chief ==
Juran was promoted to department chief in 1928, and the following year became a division chief. He published his first quality-related article in Mechanical Engineering in 1935. In 1937, he moved to Western Electric/AT&T's headquarters in New York City, where he held the position of Chief Industrial Engineer.

As a hedge against the uncertainties of the Great Depression, he enrolled in Loyola University Chicago School of Law in 1931. He graduated in 1935 and was admitted to the Illinois bar in 1936, though he never practiced law.

During the Second World War, through an arrangement with his employer, Juran served in the Lend-Lease Administration and Foreign Economic Administration. Just before the war's end, he resigned from Western Electric and his government post, intending to become a freelance consultant.

He soon joined the faculty of New York University as an adjunct professor in the Department of Industrial Engineering, where he taught courses in quality control and ran round table seminars for executives. He also worked through a small management consulting firm on projects for Gillette, Hamilton Watch Company and Borg-Warner. After the firm's owner's sudden death, Juran began his own independent practice, from which he made a comfortable living until his retirement in the late 1990s. His early clients included the now defunct Bigelow-Sanford Carpet Company, the Koppers Company, the International Latex Company, Bausch & Lomb and General Foods.

== Japan ==
The end of World War II compelled Japan to change its focus from becoming a military power to becoming an economic one. Despite Japan's ability to compete on price, its consumer goods manufacturers suffered from a long-established reputation of poor quality. The first edition of Juran's Quality Control Handbook in 1951 attracted the attention of the Japanese Union of Scientists and Engineers (JUSE), who invited him to Japan in 1952. In 1954 he finally arrived and met with executives from ten manufacturing companies, notably Showa Denko, Nippon Kōgaku, Noritake, and Takeda Pharmaceutical Company. He also lectured at Hakone, Waseda University, Ōsaka, and Kōyasan. During his life, he made ten visits to Japan, the last in 1990.

Working independently of W. Edwards Deming (who focused on the use of statistical process control), Juran—who focused on managing for quality—went to Japan and started courses (1954) in quality management. The training began with top and middle management. The idea that top and middle management needed training had found resistance in the United States. For Japan, it would take some 20 years for the training to pay off. In the 1970s, Japanese products began to be seen as the leaders in quality. This sparked a crisis in the United States due to quality issues in the 1980s.

Juran's philosophy emphasized that quality should be managed as an integral part of business strategy, involving all levels of leadership—not just engineers or quality inspectors. His message strongly resonated with Japanese executives, who integrated his teachings into company-wide initiatives. Over time, Juran’s influence contributed to a national transformation in quality thinking, laying the groundwork for what became known as Total Quality Control (TQC) in Japan. By the 1970s, companies like Toyota and Nippon Steel had incorporated Juran’s principles to such an extent that Japanese goods were no longer seen as cheap imitations but as benchmarks of excellence. Juran later reflected on this transformation, stating that “the Japanese revolution in quality was the greatest quality achievement in the history of mankind.”

== Contributions ==
=== Pareto principle ===
In 1941, Juran came across the work of Vilfredo Pareto and began to apply the Pareto principle to quality issues (for example, 80% of a problem is caused by 20% of the causes). This is also referred to as "the vital few and the trivial many." In later years, Juran preferred "the vital few and the useful many" to signal that the remaining 80% of the causes should not be totally ignored or trivialized.

=== Management theory ===
When he began his career in the 1920s, the principal focus in quality management was on the quality of the end, or finished, product. The tools used were from the Bell system of acceptance sampling, inspection plans, and control charts. The ideas of Frederick Winslow Taylor dominated.

Juran is widely credited for adding the human dimension to quality management. He pushed for the education and training of managers. For Juran, human relations problems were the ones to isolate, and resistance to change was the root cause of quality issues. Juran credits Margaret Mead's book Cultural Patterns and Technical Change for illuminating the core problem in reforming business quality. His book Managerial Breakthrough, published in 1964, outlined the issue.

Juran's concept of quality management extended outside the walls of the factory to encompass nonmanufacturing processes, especially those that might be thought of as service related. For example, in an interview published in 1997 he observed:

The key issues facing managers in sales are no different than those faced by managers in other disciplines. Sales managers say they face problems such as "It takes us too long...we need to reduce the error rate." They want to know, "How do customers perceive us?" These issues are no different than those facing managers trying to improve in other fields. The systematic approaches to improvement are identical. ... There should be no reason our familiar principles of quality and process engineering would not work in the sales process.

=== The Juran trilogy ===
Juran was one of the first to write about the cost of poor quality. This was illustrated by his "Juran trilogy," an approach to cross-functional management, which is composed of three managerial processes: quality planning, quality control, and quality improvement. Without change, there will be a constant waste; during change there will be increased costs, but after the improvement, margins will be higher, and the increased costs are recouped.

=== Transferring quality knowledge between East and West ===
During his 1966 visit to Japan, Juran learned about the Japanese concept of quality circles, which he enthusiastically evangelized in the West. He also acted as a matchmaker between U.S. and Japanese companies looking for introductions to each other.

== Juran Institute ==
Juran founded the Juran Institute in 1979. The institute is a company that provides training and consulting services in quality management, Lean Six Sigma and Business Process Management, as well as Six Sigma certification. The Institute is based in Tysons Corner, Virginia.

== Retirement ==
Juran was active into his 80s and gave up international travel only at age 86. He retired at age 90 but still gave interviews. His activities during the second half of his life include:

- Consulting for U.S. companies such as Armour and Company, Dennison Manufacturing Company, Merck, Sharp & Dohme, Otis Elevator Company, Xerox, and the United States Navy Fleet Ballistic Missile System., Steve Jobs.
- Consulting for Western European and Japanese companies such as Rolls-Royce Motors, Philips, Volkswagen, Royal Dutch Shell, and Toyota Motor Company.
- Pro bono consulting for Soviet-bloc countries (Hungary, Romania, Czechoslovakia, Russia, Poland, and Yugoslavia).
- Founding the Juran Institute and the Juran Foundation.

== Personal life ==
Juran met Sadie Shapiro in 1924, when his sister Betty moved to Chicago. They both met when Betty arrived at the train station. Juran wrote of meeting Sadie in his autobiography saying, "There and then I was smitten and have remained so ever since." In 1925, on Juran's 21st birthday, the couple became engaged. They were married 6 months later on June 5 1926. They remained married for 81 years.

Together, he and Sadie had four children, a daughter and three sons: Robert (1928–2017), Sylvia (1930–2021), Charles, and Donald. Sylvia had a doctorate in Russian literature and Robert was an award-winning newspaper editor.

At the age of 92 Juran began writing his autobiography. It was published two months before his 99th birthday.

In 2004, at the age of 100, he was awarded an honorary doctorate from Luleå University of Technology, Sweden. In May, a special event was held to mark his 100th birthday.

On 28 February 2008, at 103 years old, Juran died of a stroke, in Rye, New York. He remained active until his death, caring for himself and Sadie, who was in poor health. Sadie died 9 months later, on 2 December 2008, at the age of 103. The couple were survived by their four children, ten grandchildren, and ten great-grandchildren.

Juran left an unfinished book (37% complete), that he began writing at the age of 98.

== See also ==
- Quality by design

== Works ==
Juran cites the following as his most influential works:

=== Books ===
- Quality Handbook: The Guide to Performance Excellence, New York, New York: McGraw-Hill, 1974, OCLC 1220529
  Eventually published in seven editions: 2nd edition, 1962, 3rd edition, 1974, 4th edition, 1988, 5th edition, 1999, 6th edition, 2010 7th edition, 2017
- Managerial Breakthrough, New York, New York: McGraw-Hill, 1964
- Management of Quality Control, New York, New York: Joseph M. Juran, 1967, OCLC 66818686
- Quality Planning and Analysis, New York, New York: McGraw-Hill, 1970
- Upper Management and Quality, New York, New York: Joseph M. Juran, 1980, OCLC 8103276
- Juran on Planning for Quality, New York, New York: The Free Press, 1988, OCLC 16468905
- Architect of Quality: The Autobiography of Dr. Joseph M. Juran” ISBN 0-07-142610-8
- A history of managing for quality : the evolution, trends, and future directions of managing for quality, Milwaukee: American Society for Quality, 1995 ISBN 0-87389-341-7
- Architect of Quality: The Autobiography of Dr. Joseph M. Juran” ISBN 0-07-142610-8

=== Published papers ===
- "Directions for ASQC", Industrial Quality Control, Buffalo, New York: Society of Quality Control Engineers, November 1951
- "Universals in Management Planning and Control", Management Review, New York, New York: American Management Association, pp. 748–761, November 1954
- "Improving the Relationship between Staff and Line", Personnel, New York, New York: American Management Association, May 1956
- "Industrial Diagnostics", Management Review, New York, New York: American Management Association, June 1957
- "Operator Errors—Time for a New Look", ASQC Journal, New York, New York: American Society for Quality Control, February 1968
- "The QC Circle Phenomenon", Industrial Quality Control, Buffalo, New York: Society of Quality Control Engineers, January 1967
- "Mobilizing for the 1970s", Quality Progress, New York, New York: American Society for Quality Control, August 1969
- "Consumerism and Product Quality", Quality Progress, New York, New York: American Society for Quality Control, July 1970
- "And One Makes Fifty", Quality Progress, New York, New York: American Society for Quality Control, March 1975
- "The Non-Pareto Principle: Mea Culpa", Quality Progress, New York, New York: American Society for Quality Control, May 1975
- "Khrushchev's Venture into Quality Improvement", Quality Progress, New York, New York: American Society for Quality Control, January 1976
- "Japanese and Western Quality—a Contrast", Quality Progress, New York, New York: American Society for Quality Control, December 1978

=== In Japanese ===
- Planning and Practices in Quality Control, Japanese Union of Scientists and Engineers, 1956
  a collection of Juran's 1954 lectures
- Lectures in Quality Control, 1956
- Lectures in General Management, 1960
