= Multivariate testing in marketing =

Test a component of a marketing campaign

In marketing, multivariate testing or multi-variable testing techniques apply statistical hypothesis testing on multi-variable systems, typically consumers on websites. Techniques of multivariate statistics are used.

== In internet marketing ==
In internet marketing, multivariate testing is a process by which more than one component of a website may be tested in a live environment. It can be thought of in simple terms as numerous A/B tests performed on one page at the same time. A/B tests are usually performed to determine the better of two content variations; multivariate testing uses multiple variables to find the ideal combination. The only limits on the number of combinations and the number of variables in a multivariate test are the amount of time it will take to get a statistically valid sample of visitors and computational power.

Multivariate testing is usually employed in order to ascertain which content or creative variation produces the best improvement in the defined goals of a website, whether that be user registrations or successful completion of a checkout process (that is, conversion rate). Dramatic increases can be seen through testing different copy text, form layouts, and even landing page images and background colours. However, not all elements produce the same increase in conversions, and by looking at the results from different tests, it is possible to identify those elements that consistently tend to produce the greatest increase in conversions.

By setting up the server to display the different variations of content in equal proportions to incoming visitors, one can carry out testing on a dynamically generated website. Statistics on how each visitor went on to behave after seeing the content under test must then be gathered and presented. Websites with minor page coding changes can also utilize outsourced services for multivariate testing. These services insert their content into predefined areas of a site and monitor user behavior.

Multivariate testing essentially enables website visitors to express their preferences and determine which content is most likely to lead them towards a specific goal through their clicks. The testing is transparent to the visitor, with all commercial solutions capable of ensuring that each visitor is shown the same content on every visit.

Some websites benefit from constant, 24/7, continuous optimization as visitor response to creatives and layouts differs by time of day/week or even season.

Multivariate testing is currently an area of high growth in internet marketing as it helps website owners to ensure that they are getting the most from the visitors arriving at their site. Areas such as search engine optimization and pay per click advertising bring visitors to a site and have been extensively used by many organisations but multivariate testing allows internet marketeers to ensure that visitors are being shown the right offers, content and layout to convert them to sale, registration or the desired action once they arrive at the website.

There are two principal approaches used to achieve multivariate testing on websites. One being Page Tagging; a process where the website creator inserts JavaScript into the site to inject content variants and monitor visitor response. Page tagging typically tracks what a visitor viewed on the website and for how long that visitor remained on the site together with any click or conversion related actions performed. Page tagging is often done by a technical team rather than the online marketer who designs the test and interprets the results in the light of usability analysis. Later refinements on this method allow for a single common tag to be deployed across all pages, reducing deployment time and removing the need for re-deployment between tests.

The second principal approach used does not require page tagging. By establishing a DNS-proxy or hosting within a website's own datacenter, it is possible to intercept and process all web traffic to and from the site undergoing testing, insert variants and monitor visitor response. In this case, all logic sits on the server rather than browser-side, and after initial DNS changes are made, no further technical involvement is required from the website point of view. SiteSpect is known to employ this method of implementation.

Multivariate testing can also be applied to email body content and mobile web pages.

In addition to testing the efficacy of various creative/content executions on a website, the principles of multivariate testing can and often are used to test various offer combinations. Examples of this are testing various price points, purchase incentives, premiums, trial periods or other similar purchase incentives both individually and in combination with each other. The value of this is that marketers (both traditional and online) can use multivariate testing principles online to quickly ascertain and predict the effectiveness of offers without going through the more traditional multivariate testing methods which take significantly more time and money (focus groups, telephone surveys, etc.).

== Design of experiments ==
Statistical testing relies on design of experiments. Several methods in use for multivariate testing include:

1. Full factorial, the most straightforward method, whereby all possible combinations of content variants are served with equal probability.
2. Discrete choice and what has mutated to become choice modeling is the complex technique that won Daniel McFadden the Nobel Prize in Economics in 2000. Choice modeling models how people make tradeoffs in the context of a purchase decision. By systematically varying the attributes or content elements, one can quantify their impact on outcome, such as a purchase decision. What is most important are the interaction effects uncovered, which neither the Taguchi methods nor optimal design discern.
3. Optimal design involves iterations and waves of testings. Optimal design allows marketers the ability not only to test the maximum number of creative permutations in the shortest period of time but also to take into account relationships, interactions, and constraints across content elements on a website. This allows one to find the optimal solution unencumbered by limitations.
4. Taguchi methods, whereby a large number of combinations with multiple variations of content in multiple locations on a website need to be tested. Medium/low traffic websites can take a long time to get a large enough sample to find statistically significant differences in performance. For example, if three different images are to be tested in each of three locations, there are nine combinations to test. Taguchi methods (namely Taguchi Taguchi orthogonal arrays) can be used in the design of experiments in order to reduce the variations but still give statistically valid results on individual content elements. Taguchi uses fractional factorial designs.

== See also ==
- Web usability
- Multivariate statistics
- A/B testing
- Cultural multivariate testing
- Product optimization
