= Radoslav Harman =

Slovak mathematician

- Education: Comenius University
- Occupation: mathematician
- Scientific career
- Doctoral advisor: Andrej Pazman

Radoslav Harman is a Slovak mathematician working in the area of optimal design of statistical experiments. He is currently a docent at Comenius University.

== Biography ==
In 2004, Harman obtained PhD in statistics from Comenius University, under the supervision of Andrej Pazman. He has published 30 research papers in the field of optimal design.

== Bibliography ==
- Radoslav Harman; Luc Pronzato (2007). "Improvements on removing non-optimal support points in D-optimum design algorithms". Statistics & Probability Letters. 77 (1): 90–94. arXiv:0706.4394. doi:10.1016/j.spl.2006.05.014. S2CID 5894164.
