= Blue dot =

Blue dot or blue dots may refer to:

== Companies and organizations ==
- Blue Dot, the former name of the Faves.com social bookmarking website
- Bluedot Innovation, an Australian smartphone location technology company
- Blue Dot Network, a multi-stakeholder initiative to promote standards for global infrastructure development
- BlueDot, a Canadian software company

== Animals ==
- Blue Dot Ray, Taeniura lymma, a species of stingray
- Blue Dot Grouper, Cephalopholis argus, an Indo-Pacific fish
- Blue dot triplefin, Notoclinops caerulepunctus a New Zealand area fish
- Blue dot jawfish, Opistognathus rosenblatti a Gulf of California jawfish
- "Blue Dots", a lineage of Polwarth sheep

== Other ==
- A nickname for Nebraska's 2nd congressional district
- Blue dot taillights, blue crystals inside tail lights in 1940s, or later retro style, cars
- Blue-dot task, a question inserted in a questionnaire to identify respondents who are not paying attention
- "Blue Dots", an episode of the TV sitcom Raising Hope
- Bluedot Festival, an annual music and science festival held at Jodrell Bank Observatory
- Blue Dot, a science radio show produced by North State Public Radio
- The blue dot effect, another name for prevalence-induced concept change, a psychological phenomenon

== See also ==
- Pale Blue Dot (disambiguation)
