= Delsarte–Goethals code =

The Delsarte–Goethals code is a type of error-correcting code.

== History ==
The concept was introduced by mathematicians Philippe Delsarte and J.-M. Goethals in their published paper.

A new proof of the properties of the Delsarte–Goethals code was published in 1970.

== Function ==
The Delsarte–Goethals code DG(m,r) for even m ≥ 4 and 0 ≤ r ≤ m/2 − 1 is a binary, non-linear code of length $2^{m}$, size $2^{r(m-1)+2m}$ and minimum distance $2^{m-1} - 2^{m/2-1+r}$

The code sits between the Kerdock code and the second-order Reed–Muller codes. More precisely, we have

$$K(m) \subseteq DG(m,r) \subseteq RM(2,m)$$

When r = 0, we have DG(m,r) = K(m) and when r = m/2 − 1 we have DG(m,r) = RM(2,m).

For r = m/2 − 1 the Delsarte–Goethals code has strength 7 and is therefore an orthogonal array OA($2^{3m-1}, 2^m, \mathbb{Z}_2, 7)$.
