= Antecedent (behavioral psychology) =

Stimulus that cues an organism to perform a learned behavior

An antecedent is a stimulus that cues an organism to perform a learned behavior. When an organism perceives an antecedent stimulus, it behaves in a way that maximizes reinforcing consequences and minimizes punishing consequences. This might be part of complex, interpersonal communication.

The definition of antecedent is a preceding event or a cause – in this case it is the event that causes the learned behavior to happen.

== Learned behavior and conditioning ==
A learned behavior is created by practice or experiences, instead of coming from instincts. Learned behavior can be controlled by the reflective or reflexive systems, which in turn create cognitive learning and habitual learning. Cognitive learning is influenced directly by the environment and evaluates it in order to acquire a particular behavior. An example of cognitive learning is riding a bike, where the environment (changing of the road path, weather, turns etc.) is constantly changing, requiring the rider to adjust. Habitual learning is formed through voluntary or involuntary conditioning. Classical conditioning denotes when an organism creates reflexes based on past events. A reflex is a stimulus response that happens due to a biological response and is mediated by the nervous system. Habitual learning can then be a result of a reflex happening time after time, as the stimulus becomes more familiar.

Habitual learning uses strategies from past experiences to dictate how to behave in the present – e.g., continuing to ride a bike after initially learning how to.

Both of these learning strategies can be a result of an antecedent.

Classical conditioning was first discovered by Pavlov, who studied digestive reflexes in dogs – the results showed that different stimuli (different types of food) elicit different reflexes and responses (different compositions of saliva). He then discovered that the dogs salivated before they received the food – due to the antecedent. The antecedent became the bell that Pavlov rang before he fed the dogs, and the learned behavior became the salivation.

On the other hand, operant conditioning is when we respond for stimuli, not to it. It is another form of social learning in which the consequence of a response makes us respond more, or more often.

=== Variables ===
Antecedent stimuli (paired with reinforcing consequences) activate centers of the brain involved in motivation, while antecedent stimuli that have been paired with punishing consequences activate brain centers involved in fear. Antecedents play a different role while attempting to trigger positive and negative outcomes.

The latter is particularly important when it comes to antecedents, as bad stimuli in the environment lead to behavioral consequences.

It has been suggested that these stimuli that lead to learned behavior can be described by behavioral science principles. Reinforcement theory states that the consequences of behavior drives the behavior itself – positive behaviors are rewarded and negative behaviors are either ignored or punished.

=== Evidence ===
There are some scientific papers that argue that there are two different types of antecedent variables. These two types of antecedent variables are referred to as discriminative stimuli and setting events. Setting events differ from discriminative stimuli as setting events are believed to have an effect on the stimulus-response relationship. It has been suggested that setting events focus on three categories of stimuli (biological, physical and social variables). Discriminative stimuli are found to be present “when a behavior is reinforced”. Discriminative stimuli are believed to be the identifying event alerting the mind that a reinforcement will occur in exchange for a specific behavior.

Another scientific paper states that antecedent variables can be proximal (things like financial stressors or job satisfaction), and conducted an experiment to see if these stimuli could induce relapse to alcohol problems. The theory here is that the learned behavior is the continuance of drinking, and this is performed to the stimuli that could be losing a job. The antecedent here is a setting event, as it happens due to social variables in order to effect a response.

Similarly, a scientific book states that culture is antecedent to behavior, but that culture can also have a direct or indirect effect on the behavior. A direct effect would line up with the theory of setting events as an antecedent variable, as the culture is a direct social stimulus that causes an effect on the stimulus-response relationship. An indirect effect reinforces the theory of discriminative stimuli, as it is an identifying event that is one reason behind the learned behavior being performed.

Stimuli that activate the "motivation" part of the brain have been tested through areas of competition in certain categories like, for example, tourism places. There are a few factors that can lead to competition changes in tourism, like hospitality, food selections, cleanliness, and more. These areas of concentration (resources, facilities, etc.) are the stimuli that would be considered the second variable – setting events. This type of competitiveness affects not only where the tourists are planning on visiting, but it also affects the employees that work in tourist towns. Things like gift shops, hotels, and restaurants depend on the flow of tourism to keep their businesses thriving. This makes businesses continuously improve and change their business ways to meet consumer demands. All of these variables change the behavior of all parties involved.

=== Interventions ===
There are a number of studies that have been done in order to prevent past learned behaviors using antecedent variables. One intervention talked about preventing bad behavior in classrooms as a positive alternative to punishment. This goes against reinforcement theory, which states that the consequence of the behavior drives the behavior. When it comes to behaviors in schools, the antecedent here (without intervention) could be a number of things:

1. Attention from the teacher/peers
2. An instruction from peers/teachers that the child does not want to do
3. Communication from staff and students when the child in question has limited/no vocal language

Each of these antecedents caused a learned behavior that is unfavourable, and this article suggests some interventions to overcome the bad behavior. For example, in order to override antecedent 2, gain the students’ attention and immediately request something (e.g., a high five), before praising them and providing positive reinforcement. This intervention fits in with the idea of classical conditioning, as the child is rewarded with positive affirmation when they complete a task.

A different study agrees that these antecedent interventions do not work on reinforcement theory, and aim to reduce the probability of unwanted behavior occurring rather than punishing unwanted behavior with consequences. This article similarly agrees with another that setting events and discriminative stimuli are the two antecedent variables, and that both of these can be used in different ways in interventions. For example, behavior that happens due to discriminative stimuli (like a hard mathematics test leading to a student destroying it and being sent to the principal's office) is likely to reoccur again and again (as the child got out of doing the test by performing the behavior). To counter this, the article, suggests that the environment should be rearranged in some way so as not to provoke the individual. Changing the antecedent from a hard maths test to an easier or shorter one, or warning the child prior, had a positive effect on the behavior observed.

There are still questions surrounding the role of antecedent interventions within society, as they are relatively new and not a lot is known about its applicability cross-culturally. However, it is evident that there is potential for antecedents to be used in behavioral interventions, and they have been proven to positively influence behaviors like self-injury and aggression.
