= Saturated array =

In experiments in which additional factors are not likely to interact with any of the other factors, a saturated array can be used. In a saturated array, a controllable factor is substituted for the interaction of two or more by-products. Using a saturated array, a two-factor test matrix could be used to test three factors. Using the saturated array allows three factors to be tested in four tests rather than in eight, as would be required by a standard orthogonal array.
