= Taguchi loss function =

Graphical depicture of loss

The Taguchi loss function is graphical depiction of loss developed by the Japanese business statistician Genichi Taguchi to describe a phenomenon affecting the value of products produced by a company. Praised by Dr. W. Edwards Deming (the business guru of the 1980s American quality movement), it made clear the concept that quality does not suddenly plummet when, for instance, a machinist exceeds a rigid blueprint tolerance. Instead 'loss' in value progressively increases as variation increases from the intended condition. This was considered a breakthrough in describing quality, and helped fuel the continuous improvement movement.

The concept of Taguchi's quality loss function was in contrast with the American concept of quality, popularly known as goal post philosophy, the concept given by American quality guru Phil Crosby. Goal post philosophy emphasizes that if a product feature doesn't meet the designed specifications it is termed as a product of poor quality (rejected), irrespective of amount of deviation from the target value (mean value of tolerance zone). This concept has similarity with the concept of scoring a 'goal' in the game of football or hockey, because a goal is counted 'one' irrespective of the location of strike of the ball in the 'goal post', whether it is in the center or towards the corner. This means that if the product dimension goes out of the tolerance limit the quality of the product drops suddenly.

Through his concept of the quality loss function, Taguchi explained that from the customer's point of view this drop of quality is not sudden. The customer experiences a loss of quality the moment product specification deviates from the 'target value'. This 'loss' is depicted by a quality loss function and it follows a parabolic curve mathematically given by L = k(y–m)^{2}, where m is the theoretical 'target value' or 'mean value' and y is the actual size of the product, k is a constant and L is the loss. This means that if the difference between 'actual size' and 'target value' i.e. (y–m) is large, loss would be more, irrespective of tolerance specifications. In Taguchi's view tolerance specifications are given by engineers and not by customers; what the customer experiences is 'loss'. This equation is true for a single product; if 'loss' is to be calculated for multiple products the loss function is given by L = k[S^{2} + ($\bar{y}$ – m)^{2}], where S^{2} is the 'variance of product size' and $\bar{y}$ is the average product size.

== Overview ==
The Taguchi loss function is important for a number of reasons—primarily, to help engineers better understand the importance of designing for variation.

== See also ==
- Taguchi methods

Taguchi also focus on Robust design of model.
