= Pale Blue Dot (disambiguation) =

Pale Blue Dot is a photograph of Earth taken by the Voyager 1 space probe.

Pale Blue Dot may also refer to:

- Pale Blue Dot (book), a 1994 book by Carl Sagan
- Pale Blue Dot, a 1998 short film by Kim Tae-yong
- Lucy in the Sky, a 2019 drama film previously titled Pale Blue Dot

== Music ==
- Pale Blue Dot, a 2008 album by Benn Jordan
- Pale Blue Dot EP, a 2012 EP by Mr. J. Medeiros
- "A Pale Blue Dot", a 2008 single by Red Snapper
- "A Pale Blue Dot", a 2013 single by The Prototypes
- "Pale Blue Dot (Interlude)", a 2008 song from The Black Swan by Story of the Year
- "Pale Blue Dot", a 2013 song from Circus in the Sky by Bliss n Eso
- "Pale Blue Dot", a 2013 song by Sound of Contact
- "Pale Blue Dot", a 2015 song and video by DMK
- "Pale Blue Dot", a 2022 song from Flip That by Loona

== See also ==
- Pale Red Dot
- Blue Dot (disambiguation)
- A Pale White Dot, 2026 album by Periphery
