= Cultural multivariate testing =

In internet marketing, cultural multivariate testing is multivariate testing performed on an international website in each geographically distinct market for the purpose of website localisation, i.e. finding the best culturally tailored design for the users in that specific location.

Similarly to multivariate testing it involves testing combinations of alternative components of a website in a live environment. The number of combinations which can be run at the same time is limited only by the time it would take to collect a statistically significant sample of visitors and computational power.

A test is usually designed to measure a specific goal, such as newsletter sign-up or completing an online purchase (so-called conversion), which is indicative of the website’s overall appeal and usability in a given cultural context. By incorporating the most successful combination of design elements, the localised version of the site can significantly improve the number of conversions compared to the original version.

Cultural multivariate testing method is a recent addition to an existing body of research supporting the view that cultural tailoring is a significant factor in international website design contributing to its commercial success.

Evidence is found that local country web sites reflect the cultural values of the country of their origin, while international companies adapt their foreign websites to the cultural values of the target country, but this adaptation is not yet extensive.

Among the cross-cultural studies of websites there are those that look specifically at the use of culturally adapted images and product representations, the use of human representations, differences in brand logos and tag lines, different colour schemes, navigation, trust-building web strategies in the online shopping context, as well as many other website components and overall website look and feel. The studies confirm the existence of measurable differences in appeal, effectiveness and usability of websites between countries.

- Oban Digital provides Cultural Multivariate Testing through its GlobalMaxer tool.

Cultural multivariate testing takes this body of research one step further by providing live statistical data for any given industry sector and geographical context without the limitations of setting up an artificial experiment environment which could impact on the user’s responses.
