= Kirstine Smith =

Danish statistician (1878–1939)

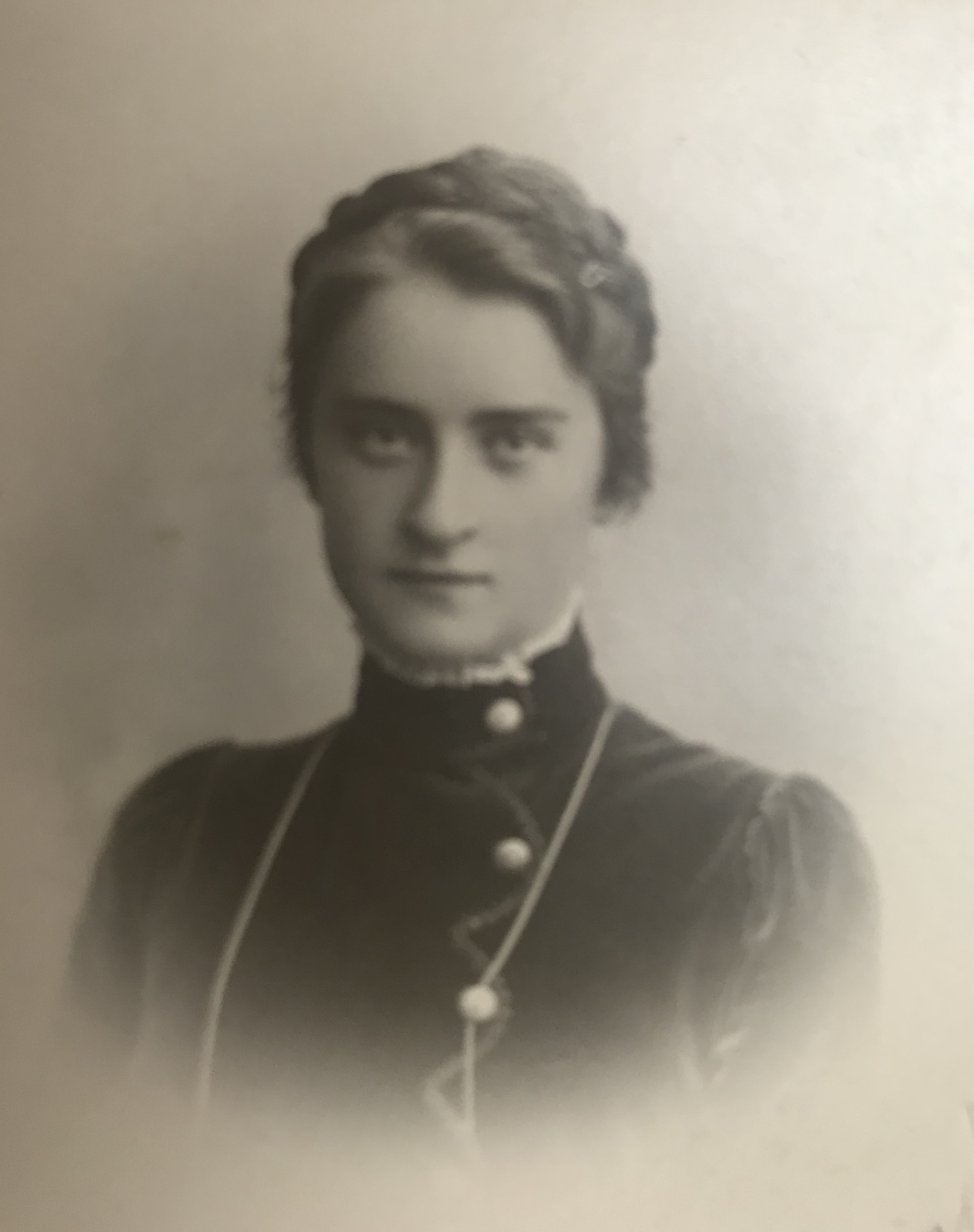
Kirstine Smith in app. 1896-1897

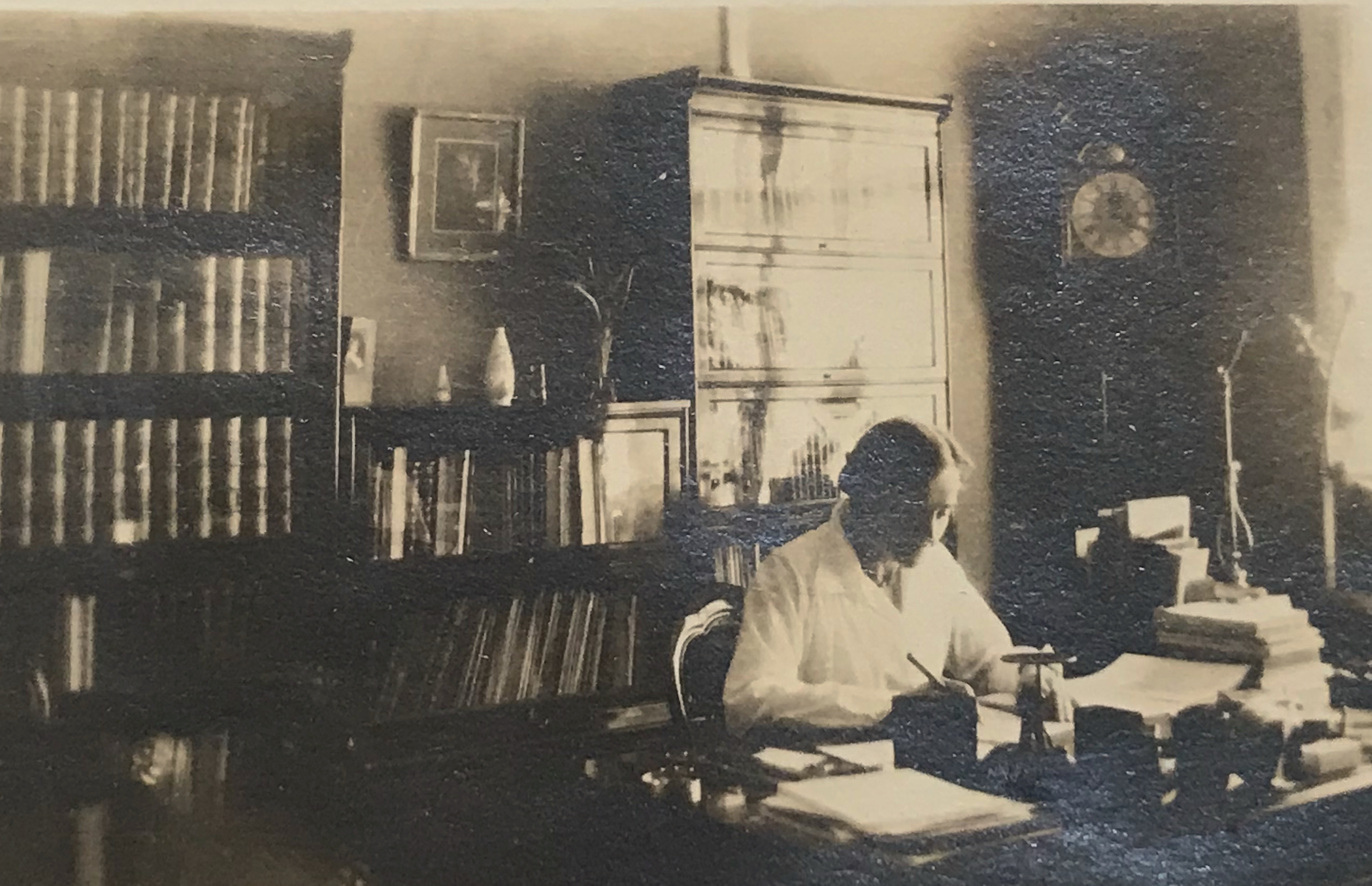

Kirstine Smith (April 12, 1878 – November 11, 1939) was a Danish statistician. She is credited with the creation of the field of optimal design of experiments.

== Background ==
Smith grew up in the town of Nykøbing Mors, Denmark. In 1903, she graduated from the University of Copenhagen with a degree in mathematics and physics. After, she worked as secretary to astronomer and statistician Thorvald Thiele and later with the International Council for the Exploration of the Sea for which she authored several volumes on fish populations.

In 1916, Smith was admitted for doctoral training at the University of London where Karl Pearson had founded the first university statistics department. She was a student of Pearson who described her as "brilliant" in a letter to Ronald Fisher. At London, she produced an influential paper in the journal Biometrika on minimum chi-square estimation of the correlation coefficient. Disagreements about aspects of her work led to increased friction between Pearson and Fisher.

In her dissertation, which was published in 1918 (see below), she invented optimal design where she computed G-optimal designs for polynomial regression of order up to 6. After finishing her doctorate she moved to Copenhagen, where she worked as a researcher for the Commission for Ocean Research 1918 to 1924 and with Johannes Schmidt at the Carlsberg Laboratory from 1920 to 1921. She eventually left research after obtaining her teaching credentials to become a high school teacher.

== Selected statistical papers ==
- Smith, K. (1916). On the 'best' values of the constants in frequency distributions. Biometrika, 11(3), 262–276.
- Smith, K. (1918). On the standard deviations of adjusted and interpolated values of an observed polynomial function and its constants and the guidance they give towards a proper choice of the distribution of observations. Biometrika, 12(1/2), 1–85.
- Smith, K. (1922).The standard deviations of fraternal and parental correlation coefficients. Biometrika, 14(1/2), 1–22.
