= Bluedot Innovation =

- Company type: Private
- Website type: Location-based service
- Available in: English
- Headquarters: San Francisco, California, United States of America
- Country of origin: Melbourne, Australia
- Area served: International
- Founders: Filip Eldic; Emil Davityan
- Website: bluedot.io
- Launched: 2012
- Current status: Active

Bluedot Innovation is a R&D-focused technology company headquartered in Melbourne, Australia. It is a high precision location service company.

== Point SDK ==
Bluedot Innovation was launched in 2012 and was further developed in 2016. It operated the Bluedot Point SDK, a software development kit that lets Android and iOS applications managed the GPS chip-set and provide location awareness to smartphones. "The Bluedot Point SDK brings high accuracy ‘always-on’ location awareness & low-energy capabilities to your mobile app."

== History ==
Bluedot Innovation was founded in Adelaide, South Australia by Filip Eldic and Emil Davityan in December 2012. The company was accepted into and participated in the ANZ Innoyz START Accelerator Program in early 2013. Upon completion of the ANZ Innovyz Start Program, the company raised funding, and expanded its board to include the founding CFO of PayPal, David Jaques. In November 2013, Bluedot Innovation received a grant from the Australian Government Agency Commercialisation Australia. To date, The company has raised $3.5 million in funding, and Jeffery Katz invested into this. It is in a licensing arrangement with CARDFREE to integrate Bluedot's locations services technology into American retail food chains. Bluedot has been featured in two 2015 case studies by KPMG and Google partner OniGroup focusing on changing the way enterprises connect with customers through IP and technology.
