= Institute of Directors (India) =

Professional association in India

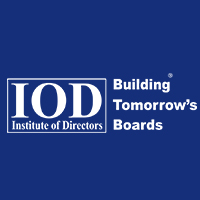
- Founder: Dr. Madhav Mehra
- Headquarters: Delhi, Bangalore, Hyderabad, Mumbai, India
- Website: iodglobal.com

The Institute of Directors (IOD), India was established in India on 12 July 1990, as a not-for-profit, apex association of Directors under the India's 'Societies Registration Act XXI of 1860' to improve their professional competence.

IOD is headquartered in New Delhi and has regional offices in Bengaluru | Chennai | Hyderabad | Mumbai. Over the past three decades, it has grown into one of India's leading organisations for directors, associating with more than 30,000 senior executives from government, private, and public sector organisations in India and abroad.

The organisation offers training and development programmes for Company Directors and Senior Executives. Its flagship training programme, the Masterclass for Directors, provides boardroom skills, governance insights, and leadership development to corporate leaders, and it also supports independent director placement.

IOD organises National and International Conferences, Webinars, Workshops, and Global Conventions focusing on corporate governance, sustainability, and leadership issues. Institute of Directors also publishes Directors Handbooks, Research Papers, Corporate Books, and a monthly journal to keep directors informed named as Directors Today of emerging trends and best practices.

The Golden Peacock Awards for Corporate Leadership and Institutional Excellence is a series of annual corporate accolades. The awards attract over 1,000 applications across sixteen categories each year.

The organisation's mission is to cultivate effective boards, advance corporate governance, and foster leadership that contributes to sustainable growth and ethical decision-making.
