= Genichi Taguchi =

Japanese statistician

- 田口 玄一
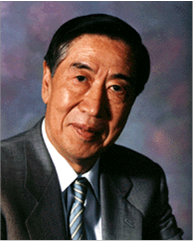
- Born: January 1, 1924; Tokamachi, Japan
- Died: June 2, 2012 (aged 88); Japan
- Citizenship: Japan
- Education: Kiryu Technical College
- Known for: Taguchi methods
- Awards: Indigo Ribbon, Shewhart Medal; Automotive Hall of Fame
- Scientific career
- Fields: engineering, statistics
- Workplaces: Aoyama Gakuin University

Genichi Taguchi (田口 玄一, Taguchi Gen'ichi; January 1, 1924 – June 2, 2012) was a Japanese engineer and statistician. From the 1950s on, Taguchi developed a methodology for applying statistics to improve the quality of manufactured goods. Taguchi methods have been controversial among some conventional Western statisticians, but others have accepted many of the concepts introduced by him as valid extensions to the body of knowledge.

== Biography ==
Taguchi was born and raised in the textile town of Tokamachi, in Niigata prefecture. He initially studied textile engineering at Kiryu Technical College with the intention of entering the family kimono business. However, with the escalation of World War II in 1942, he was drafted into the Astronomical Department of the Navigation Institute of the Imperial Japanese Navy.

After the war, in 1948 he joined the Ministry of Public Health and Welfare, where he came under the influence of eminent statistician Matosaburo Masuyama, who kindled his interest in the design of experiments. He also worked at the Institute of Statistical Mathematics during this time, and supported experimental work on the production of penicillin at Morinaga Pharmaceuticals, a Morinaga Seika company.

In 1950, he joined the Electrical Communications Laboratory (ECL) of the Nippon Telegraph and Telephone Corporation just as statistical quality control was beginning to become popular in Japan, under the influence of W. Edwards Deming and the Union of Japanese Scientists and Engineers. ECL was engaged in a rivalry with Bell Labs to develop cross bar and telephone switching systems, and Taguchi spent his twelve years there developing methods for enhancing quality and reliability. Even at this point, he was beginning to consult widely in Japanese industry, with Toyota being an early adopter of his ideas.

During the 1950s, he collaborated widely and in 1954-1955 was visiting professor at the Indian Statistical Institute, where he worked with C. R. Rao, Ronald Fisher and Walter A. Shewhart. While working at the SQC Unit of ISI, he was introduced to the orthogonal arrays invented by C. R. Rao - a topic which was to be instrumental in enabling him to develop the foundation blocks of what is now known as Taguchi methods.

On completing his doctorate at Kyushu University in 1962, he left ECL, though he maintained a consulting relationship. In the same year he visited Princeton University under the sponsorship of John Tukey, who arranged a spell at Bell Labs, his old ECL rivals. In 1964 he became professor of engineering at Aoyama Gakuin University, Tokyo. In 1966 he began a collaboration with Yuin Wu, who later emigrated to the U.S. and, in 1980, invited Taguchi to lecture. During his visit there, Taguchi himself financed a return to Bell Labs, where his initial teaching had made little enduring impact. This second visit began a collaboration with Madhav Phadke and a growing enthusiasm for his methodology in Bell Labs and elsewhere, including Ford Motor Company, Boeing, Xerox and ITT.

Since 1982, Genichi Taguchi has been an advisor to the Japanese Standards Institute and executive director of the American Supplier Institute, an international consulting organisation. His concepts pertaining to experimental design, the loss function, robust design, and the reduction of variation have influenced fields beyond product design and manufacturing, such as sales process engineering.

== Taguchi Approach to Robust Design ==
One of Genichi Taguchi’s most important contributions was the development of the concept of robust design, which aims to minimize product variability even under adverse conditions. This approach is based on the use of orthogonal arrays and the signal-to-noise (S/N) ratio analysis, with the goal of optimizing products and processes at early stages of design. The Taguchi method has been widely adopted in the automotive and electronics industries due to its effectiveness in reducing costs and improving quality.

== Contributions ==
Taguchi has made a very influential contribution to industrial statistics. Key elements of his quality philosophy include the following:

1. Taguchi loss function, used to measure financial loss to society resulting from poor quality;
2. The philosophy of off-line quality control, designing products and processes so that they are insensitive ("robust") to parameters outside the design engineer's control.
3. Innovations in the statistical design of experiments, notably the use of an outer array for factors that are uncontrollable in real life, but are systematically varied in the experiment.

== Honours ==
- 1960 - Deming Prize for Individuals
- 1986 - Willard F. Rockwell Medal of the International Technology Institute
- 1989 - Indigo Ribbon from the Emperor of Japan
- 1990 - Honoured as a Quality Guru by the British Department of Trade and Industry
- 1995 - Honorary member of the Japanese Society of Quality Control
- 1996 - Honorary Fellow of the Institute of Directors (India)
- 1997 - Automotive Hall of Fame Inductee
- 1998 - Honorary member of the American Society for Quality
- 1998 - Honorary member of the American Society of Mechanical Engineers
- 1999 - Honorary president of the Robust Quality Engineering Society (Japan)

== Books ==
- Taguchi, Genichi (1986). Introduction to Quality Engineering: Designing Quality into Products and Processes. Tokyo, Japan: Asian Productivity Organization. ISBN 978-928-3310846.
- Taguchi, Genichi (August 1992). Taguchi on Robust Technology Development: Bringing Quality Engineering Upstream. ASME Press. ISBN 978-0791800287.
- Taguchi, Genichi; Chowdhury, Subir; Taguchi, Shin (October 1999). Robust Engineering: Learn How to Boost Quality while Reducing Costs & Time to Market. McGraw-Hill Professional. ISBN 978-0071347822.
- Taguchi, Genichi; Chowdhury, Subir; Wu, Yuin (August 2000). The Mahalanobis-Taguchi System. McGraw Hill Professional. ISBN 978-0071362634.
- Taguchi, Genichi; Jugulum, Rajesh (2002). The Mahalanobis-Taguchi Strategy : A Pattern Technology System. John Wiley & Sons. ISBN 978-0471023333.
- Taguchi, Genichi; Jugulum, Rajesh; Taguchi, Shin (2004). Computer-Based Robust Engineering: Essential For DFSS. Amer Society for Quality. ISBN 978-0873896221.
- Taguchi, Genichi; Chowdhury, Subir; Wu, Yuin (2005). Taguchi's Quality Engineering Handbook. John Wiley. ISBN 978-0471413349.
