= Instructional manipulation check =

Special kind of question inserted in a questionnaire among the regular questions

Blue-dot task, a check designed to detect participants who fail to read the instructions. After Oppenheimer et al.

An instructional manipulation check, often abbreviated IMC, is a special kind of question inserted in a questionnaire among the regular questions, designed to check whether respondents are paying attention to the instructions. Discarding responses by participants who fail to read the instructions increases the signal-to-noise ratio and can thereby increase the statistical power of an experiment. The tool was developed by Oppenheimer et al.

Eliminating random responses this way before performing statistical hypothesis testing may be considered a legitimate form of data manipulation, but should be duly mentioned in publications reporting on the outcome of the experiment in question.

== Blue-dot task ==
Among several forms an IMC can take, a popular one is the so-called blue-dot task, suitable for on-line questionnaires. A number of larger blue circles are arranged according to a Likert scale from (say) "very rarely" to "very frequently". Participants who ignore the instructions and merely want to finish the task will just click any one of these circles. The instructions, however, ask the participants to ignore the larger circles and instead click a little blue dot at the bottom of the screen. Oppenheimer et al. report that in a large sample of undergraduate participants, approximately 7% failed this task.
