= Instrument effect =

The instrument effect is an issue in experimental methodology meaning that any change during the measurement, or, the instrument, may influence the research validity. For example, in a control group design experiment, if the instruments used to measure the performance of the experiment group and the control group are different, a wrong conclusion about the experiment would be reached, the research result would be invalid.
