= Experimetrics =

Experimetrics comprises the body of econometric techniques that are customized to experimental applications.

The word Experimetrics first appeared in the Economics literature in Camerer (2003, p. 42). A fairly wide range of techniques are called on in the analysis of experimental data, varying from simple treatment testing, to complex multi-equation structural models requiring fairly advanced estimation techniques.

Experimetrics refers to the application of econometrics to economics experiments. Experimetrics refers to formal procedures used in designed investigations of economic hypotheses.

One branch of experimetrics uses experiments to evaluate the performance of econometric estimators

In short, experimetrics is the field of study that lies at the intersection of experimental economics and econometrics. It refers to a broad swath of the economics literature, and encompasses both the theoretical and statistical basis of econometrics, as well as the methodology of the experimental method. Another area of this field, which is often underrepresented is "Experimental Design".Detailed statistical analysis regarding the optimal design of experiments is a very important aspect in the study of experimetrics. Many social scientists and biomedical scientists uses tools from experimetrics, response surface methodology to do research in the broad area of Meta-Analysis.
