= Andrej Pazman =

Slovak mathematician

Andrej Pázman
- Education: Comenius University
- Known for: optimum experimental design
- Scientific career
- Doctoral advisor: Juraj Bolf; Jiří Nedoma

Andrej Pázman (born 1938) is a Slovak mathematician working in the area of optimum experimental design and in the theory of nonlinear statistical models. He is an elected fellow of the International Statistical Institute (2004), of the Learned Society of SAS (2004) and also a member of the Royal Statistical Society (1992). He wrote also several books, three of them are monographs published in English. Today there are all presented by Springer. He obtained the Price of the Slovak Literary Fund for the Nonlinear statistical models (1994). In 2004, he obtained the WU Best Paper Award der Stadt Wien (together with W.G. Mueller), in 2008, the Golden Medal of the rector of CU Bratislava, in 2014, the Golden Medal of SAS and also the Price for Science and Technology from the Minister of Education of Slovakia. He is currently a professor (professor emeritus from 2016) at Comenius University Bratislava.

== Biography ==
Born 6 December 1938 in Prague, studied physics and mathematics at Comenius University (CU). In 1964 he obtained his PhD in statistics (in measurement theory) from the Institute of Measurement of the Slovak Academy of Sciences (SAS), jointly advised by Juraj Bolf and Jiří Nedoma. He left this institute in 1981 to enter in the Mathematical Institute of SAS until 1991. In the years 1966–69 he has been researcher in statistics for physics in the Joint Institutes for Nuclear Research in Dubna, Russia. In 1992 he became full professor in probability and statistics at the Faculty of Mathematics, Physics and Informatics of Comenius University, head of the department 1992–1998, head of the Section of Mathematics 1999–2002. He has been appointed as invited professor at WU Wien (1995), at Universität Augsburg (1998–1999) and at TU Wien (2000), each time for one semester.

== Bibliography ==
- Andrej Pázman (1986). Foundations of optimum experimental design. Vol. 14. Springer.
- Andrej Pázman (1993). Nonlinear statistical models. Kluwer Acad. Publ., Dordrecht. ISBN 9789401724500.
- Pronzato Luc and Andrej Pázman (2013). Design of Experiments in Nonlinear Models. Springer, New York.
