= Control variable =

Experimental element which is not changed throughout the experiment

A control variable (or scientific constant) in scientific experimentation is an experimental element which is constant (controlled) and unchanged throughout the course of the investigation. Control variables could strongly influence experimental results were they not held constant during the experiment in order to test the relative relationship of the dependent variable (DV) and independent variable (IV). The control variables themselves are not of primary interest to the experimenter.

"Good controls", also known as “confounders” or “deconfounders”, are variables which are theorized to be unaffected by the treatment and which are intended to eliminate omitted-variable bias. "Bad controls", on the other hand, are variables that could be affected by the treatment, might contribute to collider bias, and lead to erroneous results.

== Usage ==
A variable in an experiment which is held constant in order to assess the relationship between multiple variables (Note: usually two other variables are being tested, but it is possible that more will be involved.), is a control variable. A control variable is an element that is not changed throughout an experiment because its unchanging state allows better understanding of the relationship between the other variables being tested.

In any system existing in a natural state, many variables may be interdependent, with each affecting the other. Scientific experiments test the relationship of an IV (or independent variable: that element that is manipulated by the experimenter) to the DV (or dependent variable: that element affected by the manipulation of the IV). Any additional independent variable can be a control variable.

A control variable is an experimental condition or element that is kept the same throughout the experiment, and it is not of primary concern in the experiment, nor will it influence the outcome of the experiment. Any unexpected (e.g.: uncontrolled) change in a control variable during an experiment would invalidate the correlation of dependent variables (DV) to the independent variable (IV), thus skewing the results, and invalidating the working hypothesis. This indicates the presence of a spurious relationship existing within experimental parameters. Unexpected results may result from the presence of a confounding variable, thus requiring a re-working of the initial experimental hypothesis. Confounding variables are a threat to the internal validity of an experiment. This situation may be resolved by first identifying the confounding variable and then redesigning the experiment taking that information into consideration. One way to this is to control the confounding variable, thus making it a control variable. If, however, the spurious relationship cannot be identified, the working hypothesis may have to be abandoned.

== Experimental examples ==
Take, for example, the well known combined gas law, which is stated mathematically as:

$$\qquad \frac {PV}{T}= k$$

where:

P is the pressure
V is the volume
T is the thermodynamic temperature measured in kelvins
k is a constant (with units of energy divided by temperature).

which shows that the ratio between the pressure-volume product and the temperature of a system remains constant.

In an experimental verification of parts of the combined gas law, (P * V = T), where Pressure, Temperature, and Volume are all variables, to test the resultant changes to any of these variables requires at least one to be kept constant. This is in order to see comparable experimental results in the remaining variables.

If Temperature is made the control variable and it is not allowed to change throughout the course of the experiment, the relationship between the dependent variables, Pressure, and Volume, can quickly be established by changing the value for one or the other, and this is Boyle's law. For instance, if the Pressure is raised then the Volume must decrease.

If, however, Volume is made the control variable and it is not allowed to change throughout the course of the experiment, the relationship between dependent variables, Pressure, and Temperature, can quickly be established by changing the value for one or the other, and this is Gay-Lussac's law. For instance, if the Pressure is raised then the Temperature must increase.
