= Antecedent variable =

In statistics and social sciences, an antecedent variable is a variable that cannot help to explain the apparent relationship (or part of the relationship) between other variables that are nominally in a cause and effect relationship. In a regression analysis, an antecedent variable would be one that influences both the independent variable and the dependent variable.

== See also ==
- Path analysis (statistics)
- Latent variable
- Intervening variable
- Confounding variable
