= Multifactor design of experiments software =

Software that is used for designing factorial experiments plays an important role in scientific experiments and represents a route to the implementation of design of experiments procedures that derive from statistical and combinatorial theory. In principle, easy-to-use design of experiments (DOE) software should be available to all experimenters to foster use of DOE.

== Use of software ==
Factorial experimental design software drastically simplifies previously laborious hand calculations needed before the use of computers.

During World War II, a more sophisticated form of DOE, called factorial design, became a big weapon for speeding up industrial development for the Allied forces. These designs can be quite compact, involving as few as two levels of each factor and only a fraction of all the combinations, and yet they are quite powerful for screening purposes. After the war, a statistician at Imperial Chemical, George Box, described how to generate response surfaces for process optimization. From this point forward, DOE took hold in the chemical process industry, where factors such as time, temperature, pressure, concentration, flow rate and agitation are easily manipulated.

DOE results, when discovered accurately with DOE software, strengthen the capability to discern truths about sample populations being tested: see Sampling (statistics). Statisticians describe stronger multifactorial DOE methods as being more “robust”: see Experimental design.

As DOE software advancements gave rise to solving complex factorial statistical equations, statisticians began in earnest to design experiments with more than one factor (multifactor) being tested at a time. Simply stated, computerized multifactor DOE began supplanting one-factor-at-a-time experiments. Computer software designed specifically for designed experiments became available from various leading software companies in the 1980s and included packages such as JMP, Minitab, Cornerstone and Design–Expert.

Notable benefits when using DOE software include avoiding laborious hand calculations when:

- Identifying key factors for process or product improvements.
- Setting up and analyzing general factorial, two-level factorial, fractional factorial and Plackett–Burman designs.
- Performing numerical optimizations.
- Screening for critical factors and their interactions.
- Analyzing process factors or mixture components.
- Combining mixture and process variables in designs.
- Rotating 3D plots to visualize response surfaces.
- Exploring 2D contours with a computer mouse, setting flags along the way to identify coordinates and predict responses.
- Precisely locating where all specified requirements meet using numerical optimization functions within DOE software.
- Finding the most desirable factor settings for multiple responses simultaneously.

Today, factorial DOE software is a notable tool that engineers, scientists, geneticists, biologists, and virtually all other experimenters and creators, ranging from agriculturists to zoologists, rely upon. DOE software is most applicable to controlled, multifactor experiments in which the experimenter is interested in the effect of some process or intervention on objects such as crops, jet engines, demographics, marketing techniques, materials, adhesives, and so on. Design of experiments software is therefore a valuable tool with broad applications for all natural, engineering, and social sciences.
