= Sparsity-of-effects principle =

In the statistical analysis of the results from factorial experiments, the sparsity-of-effects principle states that a system is usually dominated by main effects and low-order interactions. Thus it is most likely that main (single factor) effects and two-factor interactions are the most significant responses in a factorial experiment. In other words, higher order interactions such as three-factor interactions are very rare. This is sometimes referred to as the hierarchical ordering principle. The sparsity-of-effects principle actually refers to the idea that only a few effects in a factorial experiment will be statistically significant.

This principle is only valid on the assumption of a factor space far from a stationary point.

== See also ==
- Occam's Razor
- Pareto principle
