= Stat-Ease =

American statistical software company

Stat-Ease, Inc.
- Company type: Wholly-owned
- Industry: Statistical software
- Founded: 1982
- Founder: Patrick Whitcomb
- Headquarters: Minneapolis, Minnesota, United States (U.S.)
- Key people: Martin Bezener, President & CTO; Cathy Hickman, VP Finance & Operations; Hank Anderson, VP Product Development; Pat Whitcomb, founding Principal
- Products: Stat-Ease 360 and Design-Expert software for design of experiments
- Services: Statistical software; Design of experiments training
- Number of employees: 11
- Parent: Beginning July 2019: Tecplot
- Website: statease.com

Stat-Ease, Inc. is a privately held company producing statistical software in Minneapolis, Minnesota, USA, founded by Patrick Whitcomb in 1982. The company has 11 employees and provides software packages for engineers and scientists using design of experiments (DOE) methods for optimizing development of products and processes. It also provides DOE training and consulting services.

== History ==
Stat-Ease was founded by Whitcomb while at General Mills in 1982. He later brought in two of his General Mills colleagues. The company sold its first software in June 1985. Sales increased in 1987 when the software was described as "incredibly easy to use" in a review of DOE software.

In 1988, the company released its first version of Design-Expert software, which provided the tools for response surface methods (RSM) for process optimization. This package complemented Design-Ease, which handled factorial designs, and also provided statistical tools for optimizing mixtures in the chemical process industries. In 1996, the firm added the features of Design-Ease into Design-Expert version 5 and translated it from DOS to Windows.

In 1996, Forbes magazine reported that multivariate testing (MVT) was needed for process improvement and added, "A Minneapolis software firm, Stat-Ease, sells most of the software these MVT types use."

Felix Grant, reviewing Design-Expert version 7.1.3 in Scientific Computing World magazine detailed how new control features had been added, improving the productive control.

Design-Ease was discontinued in 2018 with the release of version 11, which was also the first version of Design-Expert to be available for macOS. Then, in 2021, Stat-Ease debuted an advanced product, Stat-Ease 360. In addition to the features of Design-Expert, it included space-filling designs, Gaussian process modeling, and add-on Python scripting at launch.

Stat-Ease founder Whitcomb retired in 2019, shortly before the acquisition of Stat-Ease by Constellation Software in July 2020 via their subsidiaries Vela and Tecplot.

== Statistical design of experiments ==
Minimum-Run Resolution IV and Minimum-Run Resolution V experimental designs, a proprietary time- and money-saving design type, were invented by Patrick Whitcomb and Gary Oehlert in 2004. Minimum-run resolution IV ("MR4") factorial designs estimate all main effects, clear of two-factor or higher interactions, in a minimum of experimental runs. MR4 designs work well for factor screening. Minimum-run resolution V ("MR5") factorial designs estimate all main effects and two-factor interactions in a minimum of experimental runs. MR5 designs are typically done after screening to a vital few factors, which then need to be studied in more depth in case they interact.

Whitcomb and Oehlert won the Shewell award in 2008 for invention of the half-normal plot of effects for general factorials.

They also developed statistical tools in 2008 to calculate power for a broad range of experimental designs and precision as a power substitute via fraction of design space (FDS) for response surface methods (RSM) and mixture design.

Whitcomb co-authored the non-academic Simplified textbook series on DOE with Mark Anderson: DOE Simplified, RSM Simplified, and Formulation Simplified (with Dr. Martin Bezener as a co-author).

== Applications ==
Alberto-Culver developed a new line of scrubs using Design-Expert software from Stat-Ease.

Stat-Ease was used by Los Alamos National Laboratory researchers in designing a set of experiments designed to demonstrate the application of model validation techniques to a structural dynamics problem.

Invitrogen used Stat-Ease Design-Expert software to optimize a cell culture bioproduction system.

The United States Environmental Protection Agency (EPA) evaluated the physicochemical properties of nine surfactants used in the remediation of perchloroethylene (PCE) in aqueous solutions using a response surface quadratic design model of experiment. Design-Expert software was used to generate the experimental design and perform the analysis. The research provided predictive models for alterations in the physiochemical properties of pore fluid to surfactant enhanced acquifer remediation of PCE.

Researchers investigated the possibility of producing poly-3-hydroxybutyrate (P(3HB)) polyester using corn syrup. The concentrations of the different ingredients were optimized using DOE performed with Design-Expert software.

Researchers at the University of Nottingham demonstrated that the DNA extracted from both green and roasted coffee beans could be used in a restriction fragment length polymorphism (RFLP) based analysis to differentiate between Arabica and Robusta types of coffee. Design-Expert software was used for design of experiments comparing and optimizing yields using a variety of commercial DNA extraction kits.
