= Design–Expert =

Software Package

Design–Expert is a statistical software package from Stat-Ease Inc. that is specifically dedicated to performing design of experiments (DOE). Design–Expert offers comparative tests, screening, characterization, optimization, robust parameter design, mixture designs and combined designs.

Design–Expert provides test matrices for screening up to 50 factors. Statistical significance of these factors is established with analysis of variance (ANOVA). Graphical tools help identify the impact of each factor on the desired outcomes and reveal abnormalities in the data.

== History ==
Stat-Ease released its first version of Design–Expert in 1988.

In 1996 the firm released version 5 which was the first version of the software designed for Microsoft Windows.

Version 6.0 moved to a full 32-bit architecture and fuller compliance with Windows visual convention and also allowed up to 256 runs for two-level blocked designs.

Version 7.0 added 3D surface plots for category factors and a t-value effects Pareto chart among many other functional additions. This version also includes the ability to type in variable constraints directly to the design in ratio form.

Version 9 incorporates split-plot factorial designs including two-level full and fractional factorials, general factorials and optimal factorials.

== Features ==
Design–Expert offers test matrices for screening up to 50 factors. A power calculator helps establish the number of test runs needed. ANOVA is provided to establish statistical significance. Based on the validated predictive models, a numerical optimizer helps the user determine the ideal values for each of the factors in the experiment.

Design–Expert provides 11 graphs in addition to text output to analyze the residuals. The software determines the main effects of each factor as well as the interactions between factors by varying the values of all factors in parallel.

A response surface model (RSM) can be used to map out a design space using a relatively small number of experiments. RSM provides an estimate for the value of responses for every possible combination of the factors by varying the values of all factors in parallel, making it possible to comprehend a multi-dimensional surface with non-linear shapes.

The optimization feature can be used to calculate the optimum operating parameters for a process.

== Distribution and events ==
Whilst Stat-Ease, Inc. is based in Minneapolis, MN, the software is used globally. To assist with distribution, the company partner with a number of external international software resellers and statistical support providers.

Alongside running regular online webinars demonstrating the software's functionality and tools, Stat-Ease, Inc. also host an annual DOE Summit; since 2020 this has been hosted online, although biennial conferences were held across Europe prior to this in collaboration with their international reseller partners.

== Books referencing Design-Expert ==
Douglas C. Montgomery, “Design and Analysis of Experiments, 8th Edition,” John Wiley & Sons Inc; 8th edition (April 2012, ©2013).

Raymond H. Myers, Douglas C. Montgomery, Christine M. Anderson-Cook, “Response Surface Methodology: Process and Product Optimization Using Designed Experiments,” John Wiley & Sons Inc; 3 edition (January 14, 2009).

Mark J. Anderson, Patrick J. Whitcomb, “DOE Simplified: Practical Tools for Effective Experimentation, 2nd Edition,” Productivity Press (July 30, 2007).

Patrick J. Whitcomb, Mark J. Anderson, “RSM Simplified: Optimizing Processes Using Response Surface Methods for Design of Experiments,” Productivity Press (November 17, 2004).
