= Factorial experiment =

Experimental design in statistics

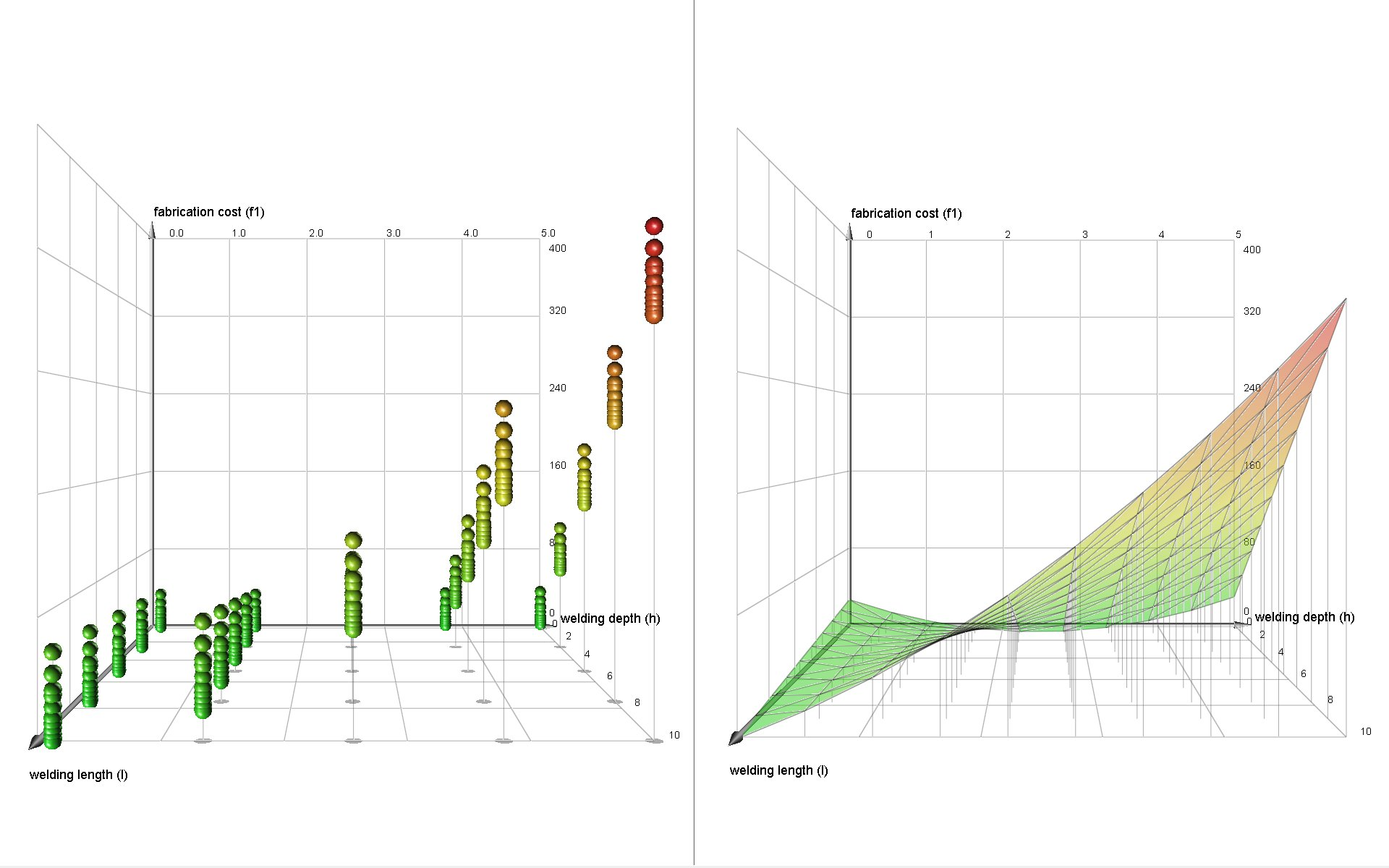
Designed experiments with full factorial design (left), response surface with second-degree polynomial (right)

In statistics, a factorial experiment (also known as full factorial experiment) investigates how multiple factors influence a specific outcome, called the response variable. Each factor is tested at distinct values, or levels, and the experiment includes every possible combination of these levels across all factors. This comprehensive approach lets researchers see not only how each factor individually affects the response, but also how the factors interact and influence each other.

Often, factorial experiments simplify things by using just two levels for each factor. A 2x2 factorial design, for instance, has two factors, each with two levels, leading to four unique combinations to test. The interaction between these factors is often the most crucial finding, even when the individual factors also have an effect.

If a full factorial design becomes too complex due to the sheer number of combinations, researchers can use a fractional factorial design. This method strategically omits some combinations (usually at least half) to make the experiment more manageable.

These combinations of factor levels are sometimes called runs (of an experiment), points (viewing the combinations as vertices of a graph), and cells (arising as intersections of rows and columns).

== History ==
Factorial designs were used in the 19th century by John Bennet Lawes and Joseph Henry Gilbert of the Rothamsted Experimental Station.

Ronald Fisher argued in 1926 that "complex" designs (such as factorial designs) were more efficient than studying one factor at a time. Fisher wrote,

No aphorism is more frequently repeated in connection with field trials, than that we must ask Nature few questions, or, ideally, one question, at a time. The writer is convinced that this view is wholly mistaken. Nature, he suggests, will best respond to a logical and carefully thought out questionnaire; indeed, if we ask her a single question, she will often refuse to answer until some other topic has been discussed.

A factorial design allows the effect of several factors and even interactions between them to be determined with the same number of trials as are necessary to determine any one of the effects by itself with the same degree of accuracy.

Frank Yates made significant contributions, particularly in the analysis of designs, by the Yates analysis.

The term "factorial" may not have been used in print before 1935, when Fisher used it in his book The Design of Experiments.

== Advantages and disadvantages of factorial experiments ==
Many people examine the effect of only a single factor or variable. Compared to such one-factor-at-a-time (OFAT) experiments, factorial experiments offer several advantages

- Factorial designs are more efficient than OFAT experiments. They provide more information at similar or lower cost. They can find optimal conditions faster than OFAT experiments.
- When the effect of one factor is different for different levels of another factor, it cannot be detected by an OFAT experiment design. Factorial designs are required to detect such interactions. Use of OFAT when interactions are present can lead to serious misunderstanding of how the response changes with the factors.
- Factorial designs allow the effects of a factor to be estimated at several levels of the other factors, yielding conclusions that are valid over a range of experimental conditions.

The main disadvantage of the full factorial design is its sample size requirement, which grows exponentially with the number of factors or inputs considered. Alternative strategies with improved computational efficiency include fractional factorial designs, Latin hypercube sampling, and quasi-random sampling techniques.

=== Example of advantages of factorial experiments ===
In his book, Improving Almost Anything: Ideas and Essays, statistician George Box gives many examples of the benefits of factorial experiments. Here is one. Engineers at the bearing manufacturer SKF wanted to know if changing to a less expensive "cage" design would affect bearing lifespan. The engineers asked Christer Hellstrand, a statistician, for help in designing the experiment.

Box reports the following. "The results were assessed by an accelerated life test. … The runs were expensive because they needed to be made on an actual production line and the experimenters were planning to make four runs with the standard cage and four with the modified cage. Christer asked if there were other factors they would like to test. They said there were, but that making added runs would exceed their budget. Christer showed them how they could test two additional factors "for free" – without increasing the number of runs and without reducing the accuracy of their estimate of the cage effect. In this arrangement, called a 2×2×2 factorial design, each of the three factors would be run at two levels and all the eight possible combinations included. The various combinations can conveniently be shown as the vertices of a cube ... " "In each case, the standard condition is indicated by a minus sign and the modified condition by a plus sign. The factors changed were heat treatment, outer ring osculation, and cage design. The numbers show the relative lengths of lives of the bearings. If you look at [the cube plot], you can see that the choice of cage design did not make a lot of difference. … But, if you average the pairs of numbers for cage design, you get the [table below], which shows what the two other factors did. … It led to the extraordinary discovery that, in this particular application, the life of a bearing can be increased fivefold if the two factor(s) outer ring osculation and inner ring heat treatments are increased together."

Bearing life vs. heat and osculation
	Osculation −	Osculation +
Heat −	18	23
Heat +	21	106

"Remembering that bearings like this one have been made for decades, it is at first surprising that it could take so long to discover so important an improvement. A likely explanation is that, because most engineers have, until recently, employed only one factor at a time experimentation, interaction effects have been missed."

== Example ==
The simplest factorial experiment contains two levels for each of two factors. Suppose an engineer wishes to study the total power used by each of two different motors, A and B, running at each of two different speeds, 2000 or 3000 RPM. The factorial experiment would consist of four experimental units: motor A at 2000 RPM, motor B at 2000 RPM, motor A at 3000 RPM, and motor B at 3000 RPM. Each combination of a single level selected from every factor is present once.

This experiment is an example of a 2^{2} (or 2×2) factorial experiment, so named because it considers two levels (the base) for each of two factors (the power or superscript), or #levels^{#factors}, producing 2^{2}=4 factorial points.

Cube plot for factorial design

Designs can involve many independent variables. As a further example, the effects of three input variables can be evaluated in eight experimental conditions shown as the corners of a cube.

This can be conducted with or without replication, depending on its intended purpose and available resources. It will provide the effects of the three independent variables on the dependent variable and possible interactions.

== Notation ==
Factorial experiments are described by two things: the number of factors, and the number of levels of each factor. For example, a 2×3 factorial experiment has two factors, the first at 2 levels and the second at 3 levels. Such an experiment has 2×3=6 treatment combinations or cells. Similarly, a 2×2×3 experiment has three factors, two at 2 levels and one at 3, for a total of 12 treatment combinations. If every factor has s levels (a so-called fixed-level or symmetric design), the experiment is typically denoted by s^{k}, where k is the number of factors. Thus a 2^{5} experiment has 5 factors, each at 2 levels. Experiments that are not fixed-level are said to be mixed-level or asymmetric.

There are various traditions to denote the levels of each factor. If a factor already has natural units, then those are used. For example, a shrimp aquaculture experiment might have factors temperature at 25 °C and 35 °C, density at 80 or 160 shrimp/40 liters, and salinity at 10%, 25% and 40%. In many cases, though, the factor levels are simply categories, and the coding of levels is somewhat arbitrary. For example, the levels of an 6-level factor might simply be denoted 1, 2, ..., 6.

The cells in a 2 × 3 experiment
B A	1	2	3
1	11	12	13
2	21	22	23

Treatment combinations are denoted by ordered pairs or, more generally, ordered tuples. In the aquaculture experiment, the ordered triple (25, 80, 10) represents the treatment combination having the lowest level of each factor. In a general 2×3 experiment the ordered pair (2, 1) would indicate the cell in which factor A is at level 2 and factor B at level 1. The parentheses are often dropped, as shown in the accompanying table.

Cell notation in a 2×2 experiment
Both low	00	−−	(1)
A low	01	−+	a
B low	10	+−	b
Both high	11	++	ab

To denote factor levels in 2^{k} experiments, three particular systems appear in the literature:

- The values 1 and 0;
- the values 1 and −1, often simply abbreviated by + and −;
- A lower-case letter with the exponent 0 or 1.

If these values represent "low" and "high" settings of a treatment, then it is natural to have 1 represent "high", whether using 0 and 1 or −1 and 1. This is illustrated in the accompanying table for a 2×2 experiment. If the factor levels are simply categories, the correspondence might be different; for example, it is natural to represent "control" and "experimental" conditions by coding "control" as 0 if using 0 and 1, and as 1 if using 1 and −1. (Note: This choice gives the correspondence 01 ←→ +−, the opposite of that given in the table. There are also algebraic reasons for doing this. The choice of coding via + and − is not important "as long as the labeling is consistent.") An example of the latter is given below. That example illustrates another use of the coding +1 and −1.

For other fixed-level (s^{k}) experiments, the values 0, 1, ..., s−1 are often used to denote factor levels. These are the values of the integers modulo s when s is prime. (Note: This choice of factor levels facilitates the use of algebra to handle certain issues of experimental design. If s is a power of a prime, the levels may be denoted by the elements of the finite field GF(s) for the same reason.)

== Contrasts, main effects and interactions ==
Cell means in a 2 × 3 factorial experiment
B A	1	2	3
1	μ_{11}	μ_{12}	μ_{13}
2	μ_{21}	μ_{22}	μ_{23}

The expected response to a given treatment combination is called a cell mean, usually denoted using the Greek letter μ. (The term cell is borrowed from its use in tables of data.) This notation is illustrated here for the 2 × 3 experiment.

A contrast in cell means is a linear combination of cell means in which the coefficients sum to 0. Contrasts are of interest in themselves, and are the building blocks by which main effects and interactions are defined.

In the 2 × 3 experiment illustrated here, the expression

$\mu_{11} - \mu_{12}$

is a contrast that compares the mean responses of the treatment combinations 11 and 12. (The coefficients here are 1 and –1.) The contrast

$\mu_{11} + \mu_{12} + \mu_{13} - \mu_{21} - \mu_{22} - \mu_{23}$

is said to belong to the main effect of factor A as it contrasts the responses to the "1" level of factor $A$ with those for the "2" level. The main effect of A is said to be absent if the true values of the cell means $\mu_{ij}$ make this expression equal to 0. Since the true cell means are unobservable in principle, a statistical hypothesis test is used to assess whether this expression equals 0.

Interaction in a factorial experiment is the lack of additivity between factors, and is also expressed by contrasts. In the 2 × 3 experiment, the contrasts

$\mu_{11} - \mu_{12} - \mu_{21} + \mu_{22}$ and $\mu_{11} - \mu_{13} - \mu_{21} + \mu_{23}$

belong to the A × B interaction; interaction is absent (additivity is present) if these expressions equal 0. Additivity may be viewed as a kind of parallelism between factors, as illustrated in the Analysis section below. As with main effects, one assesses the assumption of additivity by performing a hypothesis test.

Since it is the coefficients of these contrasts that carry the essential information, they are often displayed as column vectors. For the example above, such a table might look like this:

Contrast vectors for the 2 × 3 factorial experiment
cell	$A$	$B$		$A \times B$	
11	1	1	0	1	1
12	1	−1	1	-1	0
13	1	0	−1	0	−1
21	−1	1	0	−1	-1
22	−1	−1	1	1	0
23	−1	0	−1	0	1

The columns of such a table are called contrast vectors: their components add up to 0. Each effect is determined by both the pattern of components in its columns and the number of columns.

The patterns of components of these columns reflect the general definitions given by Bose:

- A contrast vector belongs to the main effect of a particular factor if the values of its components depend only on the level of that factor.
- A contrast vector belongs to the interaction of two factors, say A and B, if (i) the values of its components depend only on the levels of A and B, and (ii) it is orthogonal (perpendicular) to the contrast vectors representing the main effects of A and B. (Note: Orthogonality is determined by computing the dot product of vectors.)

Similar definitions hold for interactions of more than two factors. In the 2 × 3 example, for instance, the pattern of the A column follows the pattern of the levels of factor A, indicated by the first component of each cell. Similarly, the pattern of the B columns follows the levels of factor B (sorting on B makes this easier to see).

The number of columns needed to specify each effect is the degrees of freedom for the effect, (Note: The degrees of freedom for an effect is actually the dimension of a vector space, namely the space of all contrast vectors belonging to that effect.) and is an essential quantity in the analysis of variance. The formula is as follows:

- A main effect for a factor with s levels has s−1 degrees of freedom.
- The interaction of two factors with s_{1} and s_{2} levels, respectively, has (s_{1}−1)(s_{2}−1) degrees of freedom.

The formula for more than two factors follows this pattern. In the 2 × 3 example above, the degrees of freedom for the two main effects and the interaction — the number of columns for each — are 1, 2 and 2, respectively.

=== Examples ===
In the tables in the following examples, the entries in the "cell" column are treatment combinations: The first component of each combination is the level of factor A, the second for factor B, and the third (in the 2 × 2 × 2 example) the level of factor C. The entries in each of the other columns sum to 0, so that each column is a contrast vector.

Contrast vectors in a $3 \times 3$ experiment
cell	$A$		$B$		$A \times B$			
00	1	1	1	1	1	1	1	1
01	1	1	-1	0	-1	0	-1	0
02	1	1	0	-1	0	-1	0	-1
10	-1	0	1	1	-1	-1	0	0
11	-1	0	-1	0	1	0	0	0
12	-1	0	0	-1	0	1	0	0
20	0	-1	1	1	0	0	-1	-1
21	0	-1	-1	0	0	0	1	0
22	0	-1	0	-1	0	0	0	1

A 3 × 3 experiment: Here we expect 3-1 = 2 degrees of freedom each for the main effects of factors A and B, and (3-1)(3-1) = 4 degrees of freedom for the A × B interaction. This accounts for the number of columns for each effect in the accompanying table.

The two contrast vectors for A depend only on the level of factor A. This can be seen by noting that the pattern of entries in each A column is the same as the pattern of the first component of "cell". (If necessary, sorting the table on A will show this.) Thus these two vectors belong to the main effect of A. Similarly, the two contrast vectors for B depend only on the level of factor B, namely the second component of "cell", so they belong to the main effect of B.

The last four column vectors belong to the A × B interaction, as their entries depend on the values of both factors, and as all four columns are orthogonal to the columns for A and B. The latter can be verified by taking dot products.

A 2 × 2 × 2 experiment: This will have 1 degree of freedom for every main effect and interaction. For example, a two-factor interaction will have (2-1)(2-1) = 1 degree of freedom. Thus just a single column is needed to specify each of the seven effects.

Contrast vectors in a $2 \times 2\times 2$ experiment
cell	$A$	$B$	$C$	$AB$	$AC$	$BC$	$ABC$
000	1	1	1	1	1	1	1
001	1	1	−1	1	−1	−1	−1
010	1	−1	1	−1	1	−1	−1
011	1	−1	−1	−1	−1	1	1
100	−1	1	1	−1	−1	1	−1
101	−1	1	−1	−1	1	−1	1
110	−1	−1	1	1	−1	−1	1
111	−1	−1	−1	1	1	1	−1

The columns for A, B and C represent the corresponding main effects, as the entries in each column depend only on the level of the corresponding factor. For example, the entries in the B column follow the same pattern as the middle component of "cell", as can be seen by sorting on B.

The columns for AB, AC and BC represent the corresponding two-factor interactions. For example, (i) the entries in the BC column depend on the second and third (B and C) components of cell, and are independent of the first (A) component, as can be seen by sorting on BC; and (ii) the BC column is orthogonal to columns B and C, as can be verified by computing dot products.

Finally, the ABC column represents the three-factor interaction: its entries depend on the levels of all three factors, and it is orthogonal to the other six contrast vectors.

Combined and read row-by-row, columns A, B, C give an alternate notation, mentioned above, for the treatment combinations (cells) in this experiment: cell 000 corresponds to +++, 001 to ++−, etc.

In columns A through ABC, the number 1 may be replaced by any constant, because the resulting columns will still be contrast vectors. For example, it is common to use the number 1/4 in 2 × 2 × 2 experiments (Note: And 1/2^{k-1} in 2^{k} experiments.) to define each main effect or interaction, and to declare, for example, that the contrast

$(\mu_{000} + \mu_{001} + \mu_{010} + \mu_{011})/4 - (\mu_{100} + \mu_{101} + \mu_{110} + \mu_{111})/4$

is "the" main effect of factor A, a numerical quantity that can be estimated.

== Implementation ==
For more than two factors, a 2^{k} factorial experiment can usually be recursively designed from a 2^{k−1} factorial experiment by replicating the 2^{k−1} experiment, assigning the first replicate to the first (or low) level of the new factor, and the second replicate to the second (or high) level. This framework can be generalized to, e.g., designing three replicates for three level factors, etc.

A factorial experiment allows for estimation of experimental error in two ways. The experiment can be replicated, or the sparsity-of-effects principle can often be exploited. Replication is more common for small experiments and is a very reliable way of assessing experimental error. When the number of factors is large (typically more than about 5 factors, but this does vary by application), replication of the design can become operationally difficult. In these cases, it is common to only run a single replicate of the design, and to assume that factor interactions of more than a certain order (say, between three or more factors) are negligible. Under this assumption, estimates of such high order interactions are estimates of an exact zero, thus really an estimate of experimental error.

When there are many factors, many experimental runs will be necessary, even without replication. For example, experimenting with 10 factors at two levels each produces 2^{10}=1024 combinations. At some point this becomes infeasible due to high cost or insufficient resources. In this case, fractional factorial designs may be used.

As with any statistical experiment, the experimental runs in a factorial experiment should be randomized to reduce the impact that bias could have on the experimental results. In practice, this can be a large operational challenge.

Factorial experiments can be used when there are more than two levels of each factor. However, the number of experimental runs required for three-level (or more) factorial designs will be considerably greater than for their two-level counterparts. Factorial designs are therefore less attractive if a researcher wishes to consider more than two levels.

== Analysis ==
A factorial experiment can be analyzed using ANOVA or regression analysis. To compute the main effect of a factor "A" in a 2-level experiment, subtract the average response of all experimental runs for which A was at its low (or first) level from the average response of all experimental runs for which A was at its high (or second) level.

Other useful exploratory analysis tools for factorial experiments include main effects plots, interaction plots, Pareto plots, and a normal probability plot of the estimated effects.

When the factors are continuous, two-level factorial designs assume that the effects are linear. If a quadratic effect is expected for a factor, a more complicated experiment should be used, such as a central composite design. Optimization of factors that could have quadratic effects is the primary goal of response surface methodology.

=== Analysis example ===
Montgomery gives the following example of analysis of a factorial experiment:.

An engineer would like to increase the filtration rate (output) of a process to produce a chemical, and to reduce the amount of formaldehyde used in the process. Previous attempts to reduce the formaldehyde have lowered the filtration rate. The current filtration rate is 75 gallons per hour. Four factors are considered: temperature (A), pressure (B), formaldehyde concentration (C), and stirring rate (D). Each of the four factors will be tested at two levels.

Onwards, the minus (−) and plus (+) signs will indicate whether the factor is run at a low or high level, respectively.

Design matrix and resulting filtration rate
A	B	C	D	Filtration rate
−	−	−	−	45
+	−	−	−	71
−	+	−	−	48
+	+	−	−	65
−	−	+	−	68
+	−	+	−	60
−	+	+	−	80
+	+	+	−	65
−	−	−	+	43
+	−	−	+	100
−	+	−	+	45
+	+	−	+	104
−	−	+	+	75
+	−	+	+	86
−	+	+	+	70
+	+	+	+	96

Plot of the main effects showing the filtration rates for the low (−) and high (+) settings for each factor.

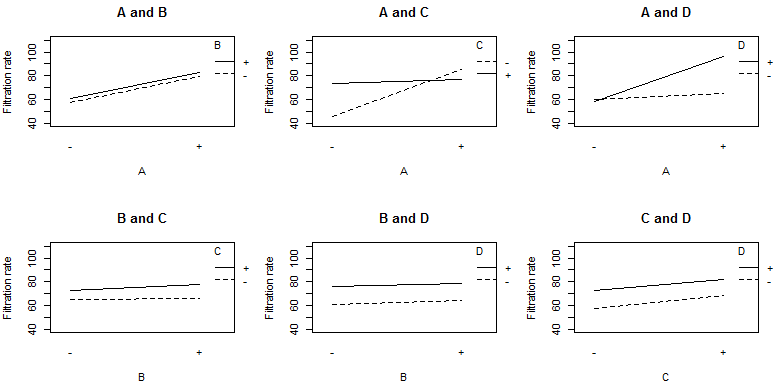
Plot of the interaction effects showing the mean filtration rate at each of the four possible combinations of levels for a given pair of factors.

The non-parallel lines in the A:C interaction plot indicate that the effect of factor A depends on the level of factor C. A similar results holds for the A:D interaction. The graphs indicate that factor B has little effect on filtration rate. The analysis of variance (ANOVA) including all 4 factors and all possible interaction terms between them yields the coefficient estimates shown in the table below.

ANOVA results
Coefficients	Estimate
Intercept	70.063
A	10.813
B	1.563
C	4.938
D	7.313
A:B	0.063
A:C	−9.063
B:C	1.188
A:D	8.313
B:D	−0.188
C:D	−0.563
A:B:C	0.938
A:B:D	2.063
A:C:D	−0.813
B:C:D	−1.313
A:B:C:D	0.688

Pareto plot showing the relative magnitude of the factor coefficients.

Because there are 16 observations and 16 coefficients (intercept, main effects, and interactions), p-values cannot be calculated for this model. The coefficient values and the graphs suggest that the important factors are A, C, and D, and the interaction terms A:C and A:D.

The coefficients for A, C, and D are all positive in the ANOVA, which would suggest running the process with all three variables set to the high value. However, the main effect of each variable is the average over the levels of the other variables. The A:C interaction plot above shows that the effect of factor A depends on the level of factor C, and vice versa. Factor A (temperature) has very little effect on filtration rate when factor C is at the + level. But Factor A has a large effect on filtration rate when factor C (formaldehyde) is at the − level. The combination of A at the + level and C at the − level gives the highest filtration rate. This observation indicates how one-factor-at-a-time analyses can miss important interactions. Only by varying both factors A and C at the same time could the engineer discover that the effect of factor A depends on the level of factor C.

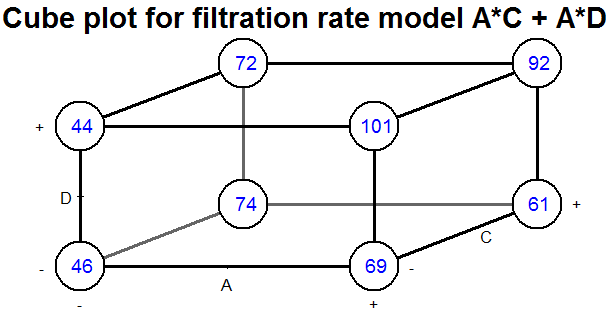
Cube plot for the ANOVA using factors A, C, and D, and the interaction terms A:C and A:D. The plot aids in visualizing the result and shows that the best combination is A+, D+, and C−.

The best filtration rate is seen when A and D are at the high level, and C is at the low level. This result also satisfies the objective of reducing formaldehyde (factor C). Because B does not appear to be important, it can be dropped from the model. Performing the ANOVA using factors A, C, and D, and the interaction terms A:C and A:D, gives the result shown in the following table, in which all the terms are significant (p-value < 0.05).

ANOVA results
Coefficient	Estimate	Standard error	t value	p-value
Intercept	70.062	1.104	63.444	2.3 × 10^{−14}
A	10.812	1.104	9.791	1.9 × 10^{−6}
C	4.938	1.104	4.471	1.2 × 10^{−3}
D	7.313	1.104	6.622	5.9 × 10^{−5}
A:C	−9.063	1.104	−8.206	9.4 × 10^{−6}
A:D	8.312	1.104	7.527	2 × 10^{−5}

== Reporting Guidelines ==
Reporting guidelines are available for factorial randomized controlled trials, such as the CONSORT 2010 extension for reporting factorial trial articles and SPIRIT 2013 extension for reporting factorial trial protocols. Detailed explanations and examples of good reporting and conduct were provided in an explanation and elaboration paper of the CONSORT and SPIRIT extensions.

== See also ==
- Combinatorial design
- Design of experiments
- Orthogonal array
- Plackett–Burman design
- Taguchi methods
- Welch's t-test
- Two-way analysis of variance
