= Optimization Systems Associates =

Optimization Systems Associates (OSA) was founded by John Bandler in 1983. OSA produced the first commercial implementation of space mapping optimization to enhance the speed and accuracy of engineering design. OSA’s primary thrust was in computer-aided design (CAD) and simulation and optimization of radio-frequency and microwave circuits and systems. Its products included developments of Bandler's space mapping concept and methodology, which facilitates effective modeling and design optimization of computationally intensive engineering systems.

== History ==
Bandler founded OSA in 1983 to commercialize optimization methodology and algorithms which he and his colleagues had developed. OSA's first major project was the reengineering of key software for simulation and optimization of waveguide multiplexers for satellite communications under contract to COM DEV International.

In the 1980s OSA contributed optimization methodology and algorithms to EEsof’s early microwave CAD software Touchstone and Libra, and then reengineered Compact Software’s principal software products SuperCompact and Microwave Harmonica.

OSA implemented a yield-driven CAD and optimization capability for Raytheon Research Division in 1985. OSA was then subcontracted by Compact Software Inc. as part of the Raytheon/Texas Instruments Joint Venture MIMIC Program within the U.S. Department of Defense. Intended contributions included optimal design centering, enhanced circuit optimization with tolerances, and enhanced wafer/chip yield in a CAE environment.

When Hewlett-Packard Company (HP) acquired OSA in 1997, the company became part of HP EEsof.

Other users of OSA's technology included Siemens, Hughes Aircraft, TRW, Raytheon, Texas Instruments and British Telecom.

== Products ==
OSA introduced the software product RoMPE in 1988. Subsequent software products included HarPE, which was introduced in 1989, OSA90 and OSA90/hope in 1991, Empipe in 1992, Empipe3D and EmpipeExpress 1996. OSA created "empath" in 1996, which was marketed by Sonnet Software, Inc.

OSA's new Geometry Capture technique allowed it to link its software directly to the premier electromagnetic simulators marketed by HP (now Keysight and PathWave Design), Ansoft (now Ansys) and Sonnet Software. The Empipe family became the framework for HFSS Designer and Momentum Optimization after HP acquired OSA.

OSA products which have been used by engineers during the implementation of design optimization include OSA90, OSA90/hope and Empipe.

Technical details of OSA's product line in 1996 are available.
