= Compact Software =

- Founded: 1973; 52 years ago
- Founder: Les Besser

Compact Software was the first commercially successful microwave computer-aided design (CAD) company. The company was founded in 1973 by Les Besser to commercialize his eponymous program COMPACT (Computerized Optimization of Microwave Passive and Active CircuiTs), released when he was at Farinon Electric Company.

== History ==
Besser began working on simulators during his employment at HP (1966–1969), using the BASIC computer language and time-sharing computers. After leaving HP, he joined the newly formed microwave division of Fairchild Semiconductor, where he authored his first-generation program, SPEEDY, in 1970 to promote Fairchild's transistors. SPEEDY lacked the optimization feature, represented by the 'O' in the COMPACT acronym, but included a large s-parameter database with the all Fairchild's bipolar and GaAs microwave transistors. Fairchild customers had access to that database through SPEEDY. Besser later converted another program, originally written for his graduate thesis work, to run on a commercial time-share system and launched a part-time business, Compact Engineering (later renamed Compact Software). This second-generation program, COMPACT, included circuit optimization capability and noise analysis, a wide range of active and passive microwave components, and was offered through five different international time-sharing systems. It quickly became the industry standard, used heavily by companies developing products for defense industries. Some of the companies also purchased the program for in-house installation. In 1976 he left his engineering employment to dedicate all his energies to CAD. His father-in-law, a long-time employee of Standard Oil Co, was very concerned about Besser's new venture. His worries were summarized by saying, "I cannot see how anyone could make a living by selling computer programs."

In 1980, Compact merged with Communication Satellite Corporation (COMSAT), creating a new division with Besser heading the microwave CAD development. The new company aimed at increasing engineering efficiency. A third-generation program, SuperCOMPACT was released in 1981. SuperCOMPACT enjoyed worldwide monopoly with nearly 400 international companies using it through timesharing as well as on-site installation in large-scale mainframes as well as mini-computers. Besser left three years later to form a new company, Besser Associates, focusing on continuing education of RF and microwave professionals.

In 1983, another key Compact employee, William Childs, left and teamed up with Chuck Abronson to form a new software company, EEsof. Their first product, Touchstone, was written directly for then new IBM PC and quickly became popular among microwave circuit designers. In 1985, H-P started selling Microwave Design System (MDS), developed earlier for internal use. (Later, in 1993, EEsof was acquired by H-P and TouchStone was marketed alongside MDS, for PCs and UNIX-based workstations respectively.) After losing Compact Software's original leadership and facing competition from EEsof and H-P, COMSAT decided to exit the CAD business by selling the Compact assets to Dr. Ulrich L. Rohde in 1985. Over the next twelve years the number of employees increased to over 100. Becoming a partner in the 1988 DARPA MIMIC program, and mostly financed from earnings rather than DARPA money, SuperCOMPACT's mainframe and PC versions went through major updates—including re-engineering and new documentation created by Optimization Systems Associates under John Bandler's leadership. Stephen W. Director introduced advanced optimization algorithms and yield-driven design, thus improving reliability and accuracy of microwave models. The latter capabilities were verified by Raytheon, Texas Instruments and other users.

The most significant contributions in this period were:

- N-dimensional nodal noise analysis for all types of both linear and non-linear circuits, including oscillators, mixers and amplifiers under large signal conditions.
- Lookup tables and curve fitting replaced by efficient EM-based models e.g. multi-coupled line models.
- Nodal-based harmonic balance simulator with stable convergence for multi-tone analysis (together with Vittorio Rizzoli, University of Bologna). This is important for mixers (3-tones) and n-stage designs where more harmonics are generated.
- Nonlinear microwave models such as GaAs, HBT etc.
- Yield analysis and yield-driven optimization capability.
- Non-linear optimization enabling oscillators to be optimized for best phase.

As Ansoft was missing circuit simulation, system simulation and filter synthesis, and Compact Software was missing a good EM simulator, so Dr. Rohde negotiated the acquisition of Compact with Ansoft in 1997. He served on Ansoft board of directors until 2001. After the merger with Ansoft, the Harmonica Program became Ansoft Designer. In 2008, ANSYS acquired Ansoft. The product was renamed ANSYS DesignerRF.

== See also ==
- Lothar Rohde - father of Ulrich L. Rohde and co-founder of Rohde & Schwarz
