= Space mapping =

Design optimization methodology

The space mapping methodology for modeling and design optimization of engineering systems was first discovered by John Bandler in 1993. It uses relevant existing knowledge to speed up model generation and design optimization of a system. The knowledge is updated with new validation information from the system when available.

== Concept ==
The space mapping methodology employs a "quasi-global" formulation that intelligently links companion "coarse" (ideal or low-fidelity) and "fine" (practical or high-fidelity) models of different complexities. In engineering design, space mapping aligns a very fast coarse model with the expensive-to-compute fine model so as to avoid direct expensive optimization of the fine model. The alignment can be done either off-line (model enhancement) or on-the-fly with surrogate updates (e.g., aggressive space mapping).

== Methodology ==
At the core of the process is a pair of models: one very accurate but too expensive to use directly with a conventional optimization routine, and one significantly less expensive and, accordingly, less accurate. The latter (fast model) is usually referred to as the "coarse" model (coarse space). The former (slow model) is usually referred to as the "fine" model. A validation space ("reality") represents the fine model, for example, a high-fidelity physics model. The optimization space, where conventional optimization is carried out, incorporates the coarse model (or surrogate model), for example, the low-fidelity physics or "knowledge" model. In a space-mapping design optimization phase, there is a prediction or "execution" step, where the results of an optimized "mapped coarse model" (updated surrogate) are assigned to the fine model for validation. After the validation process, if the design specifications are not satisfied, relevant data is transferred to the optimization space ("feedback"), where the mapping-augmented coarse model or surrogate is updated (enhanced, realigned with the fine model) through an iterative optimization process termed "parameter extraction". The mapping formulation itself incorporates "intuition", part of the engineer's so-called "feel" for a problem. In particular, the Aggressive Space Mapping (ASM) process displays key characteristics of cognition (an expert's approach to a problem), and is often illustrated in simple cognitive terms.

== Development ==
Following John Bandler's concept in 1993, algorithms have utilized Broyden updates (aggressive space mapping), trust regions, and artificial neural networks. Developments include implicit space mapping, in which we allow preassigned parameters not used in the optimization process to change in the coarse model, and output space mapping, where a transformation is applied to the response of the model. A 2004 paper reviews the state of the art after the first ten years of development and implementation. Tuning space mapping utilizes a so-called tuning model—constructed invasively from the fine model—as well as a calibration process that translates the adjustment of the optimized tuning model parameters into relevant updates of the design variables. The space mapping concept has been extended to neural-based space mapping for large-signal statistical modeling of nonlinear microwave devices. Space mapping is supported by sound convergence theory and is related to the defect-correction approach.

A 2016 state-of-the-art review is devoted to aggressive space mapping. It spans two decades of development and engineering applications. A comprehensive 2021 review paper discusses space mapping in the context of radio frequency and microwave design optimization; in the context of engineering surrogate model, feature-based and cognition-driven design; and in the context of machine learning, intuition, and human intelligence.

The space mapping methodology can also be used to solve inverse problems. Proven techniques include the Linear Inverse Space Mapping (LISM) algorithm, as well as the Space Mapping with Inverse Difference (SM-ID) method.

== Category ==
Space mapping optimization belongs to the class of surrogate-based optimization methods, that is to say, optimization methods that rely on a surrogate model.

== Applications ==
The space mapping technique has been applied in a variety of disciplines including microwave and electromagnetic design, civil and mechanical applications, aerospace engineering, and biomedical research. Some examples:

- Optimizing aircraft wing curvature
- Automotive crashworthiness design
- EEG source analysis
- Handset antenna optimization
- Design centering of microwave circuits
- Design of electric machines using multi-physical modeling
- Control of partial differential equations.
- Voice coil actuator design
- Reconstruction of local magnetic properties
- Structural optimization
- Design of microwave filters and multiplexers
- Optimization of delay structures
- Power electronics
- Signal integrity
- Civil engineering

== Simulators ==
Various simulators can be involved in a space mapping optimization and modeling processes.

- In the microwave and radio frequency (RF) area
  - Keysight ADS
  - Keysight Momentum
  - Ansys HFSS
  - CST Microwave Studio
  - FEKO
  - Sonnet em

== Conferences ==
Three international workshops have focused significantly on the art, the science and the technology of space mapping.

- First International Workshop on Surrogate Modelling and Space Mapping for Engineering Optimization (Lyngby, Denmark, Nov. 2000)
- Second International Workshop on Surrogate Modelling and Space Mapping for Engineering Optimization (Lyngby, Denmark, Nov. 2006)
- Third International Workshop on Surrogate Modelling and Space Mapping for Engineering Optimization (Reykjavik, Iceland, Aug. 2012)

== Terminology ==
There is a wide spectrum of terminology associated with space mapping: ideal model, coarse model, coarse space, fine model, companion model, cheap model, expensive model, surrogate model, low fidelity (resolution) model, high fidelity (resolution) model, empirical model, simplified physics model, physics-based model, quasi-global model, physically expressive model, device under test, electromagnetics-based model, simulation model, computational model, tuning model, calibration model, surrogate model, surrogate update, mapped coarse model, surrogate optimization, parameter extraction, target response, optimization space, validation space, neuro-space mapping, implicit space mapping, output space mapping, port tuning, predistortion (of design specifications), manifold mapping, defect correction, model management, multi-fidelity models, variable fidelity/variable complexity, multigrid method, coarse grid, fine grid, surrogate-driven, simulation-driven, model-driven, feature-based modeling.

== See also ==
- Adaptive control
- Cognitive model
- Computational electromagnetics
- Computer-aided design
- Engineering optimization
- Finite element method
- Kriging
- Linear approximation
- Machine learning
- Mental model
- Mental rotation
- Mirror neuron
- Model-dependent realism
- Multiphysics
- Performance tuning
- Response surface methodology
- Semiconductor device modeling
- Spatial cognition
- Spatial memory
- Support vector machine
- Theory of mind
