= Les Besser =

American electronics engineer

Les Besser (born 1936) is an American electronics engineer, an expert in microwave technology. He is the founder (1973) of Compact Software, the first commercially successful microwave computer-aided design (CAD) company, which commercialize his program COMPACT (Computerized Optimization of Microwave Passive and Active CircuiTs).

Les Besser was born and raised in Hungary (interbellum and World War II Hungary and the Hungarian People's Republic). In 1956, he escaped to the West, and he became a Canadian citizen in 1971. Later, he moved to the United States, graduated from the University of Colorado Boulder, and, in 2000, he became a naturalized U.S. citizen.

Besser began working on simulators during his employment at Hewlett-Packard (1966–1969), using the BASIC computer language and time-sharing computers. After leaving HP, he joined the newly formed microwave division of Fairchild Semiconductor, where he authored his first-generation program, SPEEDY, Besser later converted another program, originally written for his graduate thesis work, to run on a commercial time-share system and launched a part-time business, Compact Engineering (later renamed Compact Software). Besser submitted the description of COMPACT to IEEE Transactions on Circuit Theory in 1972, but it was initially rejected, and was not accepted until after the addition of a large amount of mathematics into it. Besser was associated with development of COMPACT until 1983. In 1985, Besser founded Besser Associates, a company that offers education in microwave technology. He also co-authored several textbooks on the subject. In 2004, he retired and sold the company but continued occasionally teaching courses.

Besser has received numerous international recognitions and awards and was listed in the Marquis "Who Is Who in American Colleges and Universities" in 1966 and "Who Is Who in the World" in 1995.

In 2013, The Hewlett-Packard Memory Project published Les Besser's two-volume memoir, "Hurdling to Freedom: A Hungarian's Escape to America," downloadable without charge from the Project's website.

From 1988 to 1990 he was the editorial director of Microwave Systems News (MSN) magazine.

He has been a member of the American Hungarian Federation. In 2018, Besser and his wife Susan were living in Carlsbad, California.

== Awards and recognition ==
- IEEE Life Fellow
- 1983: IEEE MTT "Microwave Applications Award"
- 1987: IEEE RFTG "Career Award"
- 2000: IEEE "Third Centennial Medal"
- 2006: IEEE Educational Activities Board's "Meritorious Achievement Award in Continuing Education"
- 2007: IEEE MTT "Distinguished Educator" award
- 2024: IEEE MTT "Career Award"
