= Rotary joint =

Rotary joint may refer to:

- Coupling, a mechanical device used to connect two shafts together at their ends for the purpose of transmitting power, including flexible couplings
- Rotary union, a coupling for passing fluid through a rotating joint
- Pivot joint, between animal bones
- Slip ring assembly, used to send electrical power and signals across a rotating connection
- Waveguide rotary joint, used to send microwave power and signals across a rotating connection
- Integrated Truss Structure § Solar alpha rotary joint, in the International Space Station
