= Muzzle velocity =

Velocity of projectile the moment it leaves the gun barrel

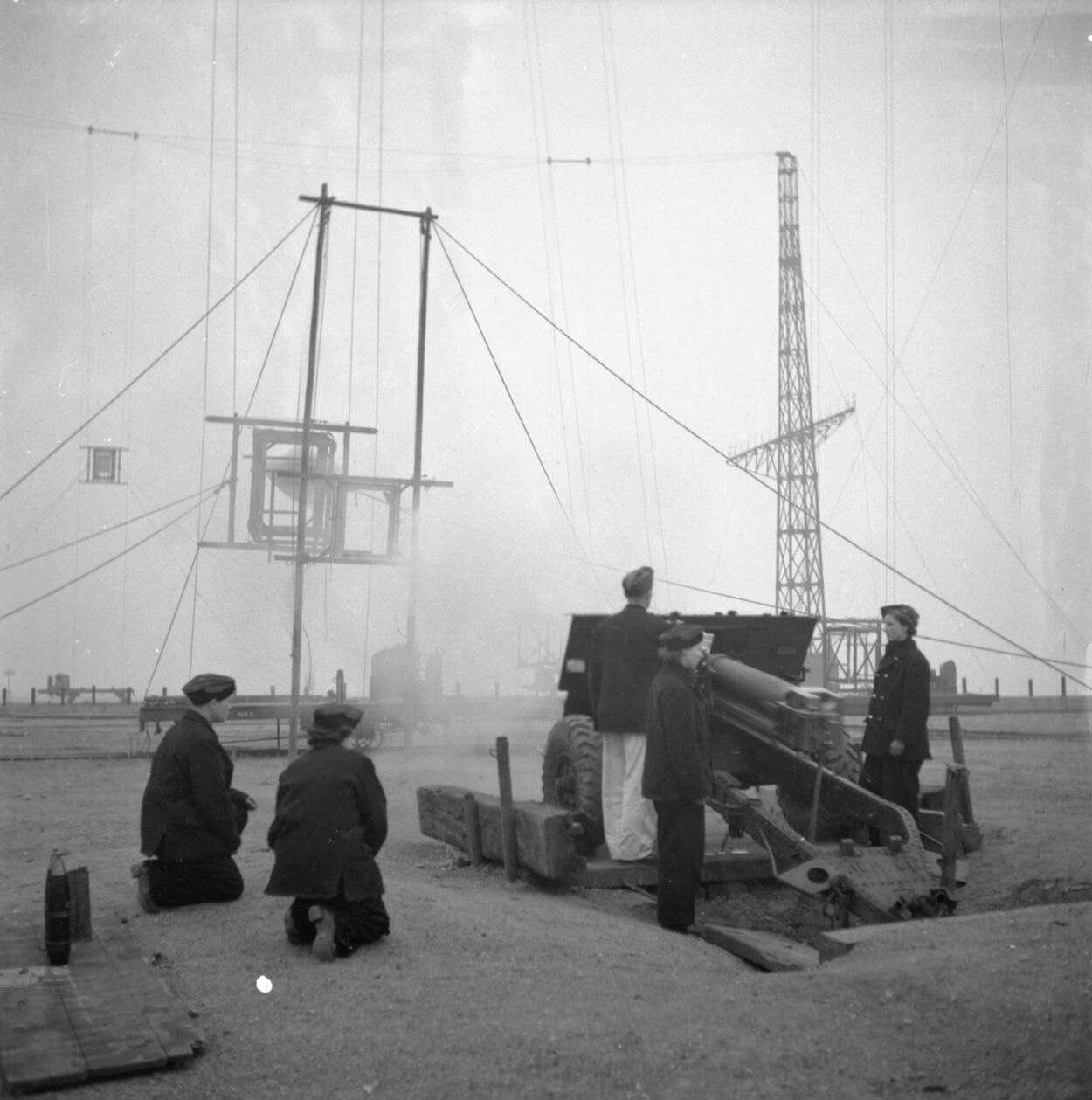
Women of the Auxiliary Territorial Service firing a 25 pounder shell at the Royal Artillery experimental station at Shoeburyness. The shells are fired through a velocity screen, which has a grid of copper wire. When the shell is fired through the wire, the circuit is broken, by which the speed of the shell can be checked.

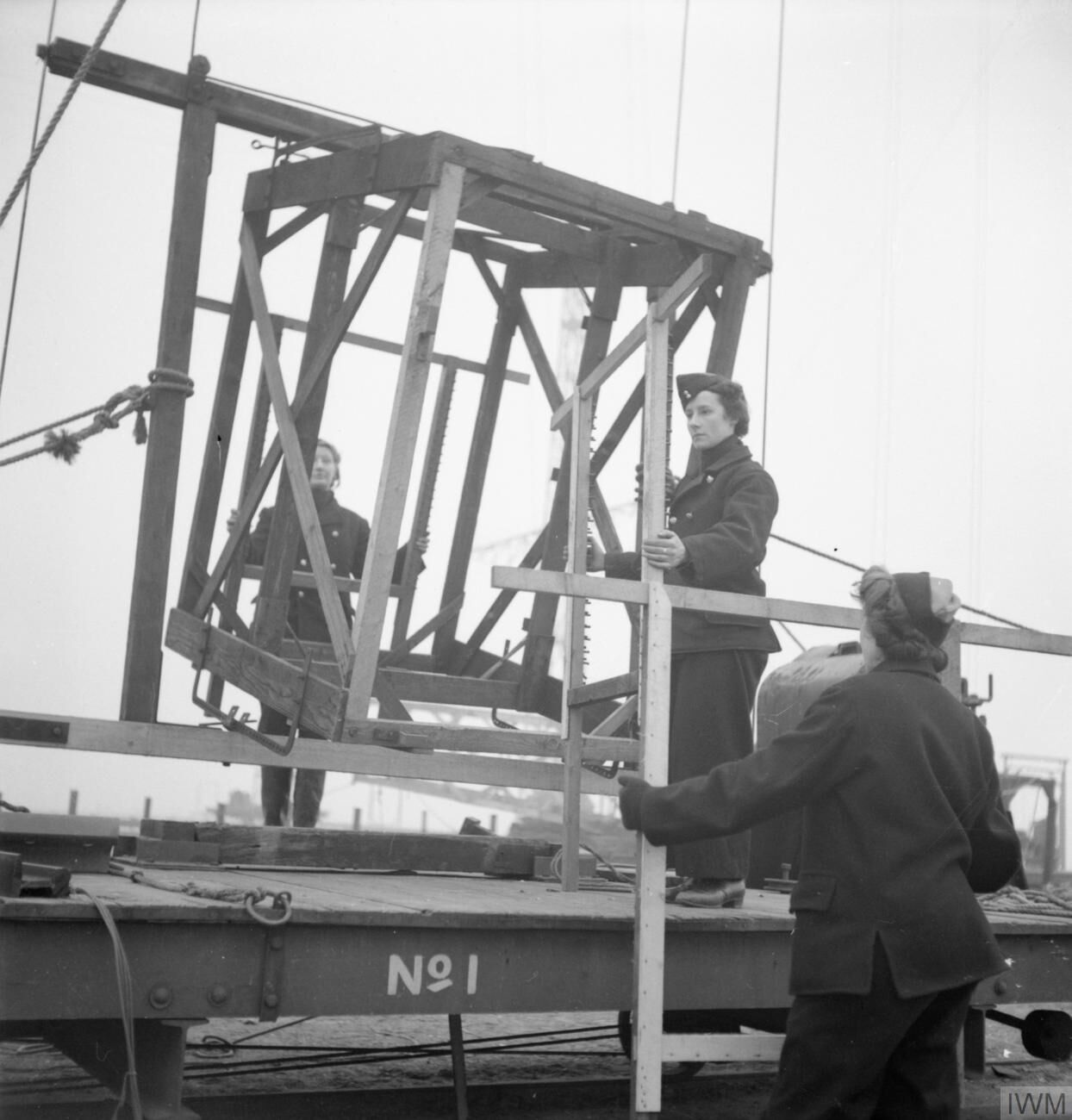
The velocity screen being disassembled after use.

Muzzle velocity is the speed of a projectile (bullet, pellet, slug, ball/shots or shell) at the moment it leaves the end of a gun's barrel (i.e. the muzzle). Firearm muzzle velocities range from approximately 120 m/s (390 ft/s) to 370 m/s (1,200 ft/s) in black powder muskets, to more than 1,200 m/s (3,900 ft/s) in modern rifles with high-velocity cartridges such as the .220 Swift and .204 Ruger, all the way to 1,700 m/s (5,600 ft/s) for tank guns firing kinetic energy penetrator ammunition. To simulate orbital debris impacts on spacecraft, NASA launches projectiles through light-gas guns at speeds up to 8,500 m/s (28,000 ft/s). Several factors, including the type of firearm, the cartridge, and the barrel length, determine the bullet's muzzle velocity.

== Projectile velocity ==
For projectiles in unpowered flight, its velocity is highest at leaving the muzzle and drops off steadily because of air resistance. Projectiles traveling less than the speed of sound (about 340 m/s (1,100 ft/s) in dry air at sea level) are subsonic, while those traveling faster are supersonic and thus can travel a substantial distance and even hit a target before a nearby observer hears the sound of the weapon being fired. Projectile speed through air depends on a number of factors such as barometric pressure, humidity, air temperature and wind speed.

A 1-gram (15.4-grain) projectile was accelerated to velocities exceeding 9,000 m/s (30,000 ft/s) at Sandia National Laboratories in 1994. The gun operated in two stages. First, burning gunpowder was used to drive a piston to pressurize hydrogen to 10,000 atm (1.0 GPa). The pressurized gas was then released to a secondary piston, which traveled forward into a shock-absorbing "pillow", transferring the energy from the piston to the projectile on the other side of the pillow.

== Conventional guns ==
In conventional guns, muzzle velocity is determined by the quantity of the propellant, its quality (in terms of chemical burn speed and expansion), the mass of the projectile, and the length of the barrel. A slower-burning propellant needs a longer barrel to finish its burn before leaving, but conversely can use a heavier projectile. This is a mathematical tradeoff. A faster-burning propellant may accelerate a lighter projectile to higher speeds if the same amount of propellant is used. Within a gun, the gaseous pressure created as a result of the combustion process is a limiting factor on projectile velocity. Consequently, propellant quality and quantity, projectile mass, and barrel length must all be balanced to achieve safety and to optimize performance.

Longer barrels give the propellant force more time to work on propelling the bullet. For this reason longer barrels generally provide higher velocities, everything else being equal. As the bullet moves down the bore, however, the propellant's gas pressure behind it diminishes. Given a long enough barrel, there would eventually be a point at which friction between the bullet and the barrel, and air resistance, would equal the force of the gas pressure behind it, and from that point, the velocity of the bullet would decrease.

== Rifles ==
Rifled barrels have spiral twists carved inside them that spin the bullet so that it remains stable in flight. This mechanism is known as rifling. Longer barrels provide more opportunity to rotate the bullet before it leaves the gun. Provided there's enough rifling in the barrel to adequately stabilize a particular round, there is no appreciable increase in precision with increasing barrel length. Longer barrels make it easier to aim if using iron sights, because of the longer sight radius, and with the right propellant load they can increase muzzle velocity, which gives a flatter trajectory and reduces the need to adjust for range.

A bullet, while moving through its barrel, is being pushed forward by the gas expanding behind it. This gas is created following the trigger being pulled, causing the firing pin to strike the primer, which in turn ignites the solid propellant packed inside the bullet cartridge, making it combust while situated in the chamber. Once it leaves the barrel, the force of the expanding gas ceases to propel the bullet forth. When a bullet is fired from a handgun with a 2-inch (51 mm) barrel, the bullet only has a 2-inch (51 mm) "runway" to be spun before it leaves the barrel. Likewise, it has only a 2-inch (51 mm) space in which to accelerate before it must fly without any additional force behind it. In some instances, the powder may not have even been fully burned in guns with short barrels. So, the muzzle velocity of a 2-inch (51 mm) barrel is less than that of a 4-inch (100 mm) barrel, which is less than that of a 6-inch (150 mm) barrel.

Large naval guns will have high length-to-diameter ratios, ranging between 38:1 to 50:1. This length ratio maximizes the projectile velocity. There is much interest in modernizing naval weaponry by using electrically powered railguns, which shoot projectiles using an electromagnetic pulse. These overcome the limitations noted above. With these railguns, a constant acceleration is provided along the entire length of the device by means of the electromagnetic pulse. This greatly increases the muzzle velocity. Another significant advantage of railguns is not requiring explosive propellant. The result of this is that a ship will not need to transport propellant and that a land-station will not have to maintain an inventory of it either. Explosive propellant, stored in large quantities, is susceptible to explosion. While this can be mitigated with safety precautions, railguns eschew the need for such measures altogether. Even the projectile's internal charges may be eliminated due to the already high velocity. This means the projectile becomes a strictly kinetic weapon.

== Categories of velocity ==
The United States Army defines different categories of muzzle velocity for different classes of weapons:

Weapon	Low velocity	High velocity	Hypervelocity
Artillery cannons	Less than 396 m/s (1,299 ft/s)	Between 910 and 1,070 m/s (3,000–3,500 ft/s)	Greater than 1,070 m/s (3,500 ft/s)
Tank guns	-	Between 470 and 1,020 m/s (1,550–3,350 ft/s)	Greater than 1,020 m/s (3,350 ft/s)
Small arms	-	Between 1,070 and 1,520 m/s (3,500–5,000 ft/s)	Greater than 1,520 m/s (5,000 ft/s)

== See also ==
- Firearm
- Gun chronograph
- Internal ballistics
- Muzzle energy
