= RF microwave CAE CAD =

RF microwave CAE CAD is computer-aided design (CAD) using computer technology to aid in the design, modeling, and simulation of an RF (Radio Frequency) or microwave product. It is a visual and symbol-based method of communication whose conventions are particular to RF/microwave engineering.

== Scope of design ==
RF and microwave circuit design and simulation software for the electronic design automation (EDA) marketplace includes but not limited to circuit simulation, analysis, schematic capture, and integrated design environment for synthesis tools which automate the design of HF (high frequency) circuits from RF to microwave to millimeter waves. Physical modeling of stripline and microstrip for transmission lines. A wide range of applications are possible, from analog sub-circuit design to RF circuit design for complex wireless communications systems.

== Scope of modeling ==
There are a vast number of device or component types which can be simulated in computer aided design software. Generally, the degree of complexity for modeling depends on the software package and the synthesis of off-the-shelf models and application-specific custom models. The component types can be categorized as follows: amplifiers, antennas, attenuators, cabling, capacitors, circulators, combiners, couplers, connectors, DC blocks, delay lines, detectors, diodes, dividers, ferrites, filters, inductors, isolators, limiters, mixers, oscillators, phase shifters, resistors, rotary joints, switches, transistors, terminators, and waveguides.

== Tools ==
A harmonic-balance and linear microwave analysis tool, named Agile, for microwave circuits is available for download. A parallelized version was also developed, but this version is not available.

== See also ==
- Computational electromagnetics
- Computer-aided design
- Engineering optimization
- Finite element method
- Multiphysics
- Semiconductor device modeling
- Simulation
- Space mapping
- Surrogate model
