= Mind model =

Mind model may refer to:

- Conceptual model, any scientific model made of the composition of concepts.
  - Mental model, a thought process that reflects how something works in the real world.
  - Cognitive model, a model of the cognitive processes of humans and other beings with minds.
  - Conceptual model (computer science), a cognitive model used to study a problem domain.
  - Conceptual framework, an analytical tool used to organize ideas.
- Space mapping, a mathematical formulation of the engineer's (or expert's) "feel" for a problem.
- Theory of mind which, in psychology, refers to the ability to attribute mental states to a person other than oneself.
