= GEK =

GEK may refer to:

- EKO Cobra, an Austrian counter-terrorism unit
- GEK Terna, a Greek conglomerate
- Gradient-enhanced kriging
- Yiwom language
