= Advanced Design System =

Electronic design automation software system

- Developer: Keysight Technologies PathWave Design
- Release: 1985 (then called Microwave Design System (MDS))
- Operating system: Linux, Windows
- Platform: ADS platforms
- Type: Electronic circuit simulation
- License: Proprietary
- Website: Official website

Advanced Design System (ADS) is an electronic design automation software system produced by PathWave Design, a division of Keysight Technologies. It is commonly used in the design of high-frequency RF circuits and microwave circuits. It provides tools for schematic capture, layout, design rule checking and layout versus schematic and simulation. It supports frequency-domain and time-domain circuit simulation, and electromagnetic field simulation.

== See also ==
- Momentum (electromagnetic simulator) — 3D Planar EM simulator element of ADS platforms
- FEM Element — Arbitrary 3D geometry EM simulator element of ADS platforms

== Notes ==
The deprecated Tektronix ADS is another, unrelated, electronic design automation system composed of TekSpice and QuickIC.
