= Momentum (electromagnetic simulator) =

Momentum 3D Planar EM Simulator
- Developer: Keysight EEsof EDA
- Platform: Element in ADS
- Type: EM simulation
- Website: www.keysight.com/us/en/products/software/pathwave-design-software/pathwave-advanced-design-system/pathwave-ads-simulation-elements/momentum-g2-element.html

Momentum is 3-D planar EM simulation software for electronics and antenna analysis, a partial differential equation solver of Maxwell's equations based on the method of moments. It is a 3-D planar electromagnetic (EM) simulator used for passive circuit analysis.

It combines full-wave and quasi-static EM solvers to provide insight into EM behavior of MMIC, RFIC, RF Board, Signal Integrity, and antenna designs. The Momentum simulation engine is integrated into Keysight ADS and Keysight Genesys.

It was originally developed by a Belgian company, Alphabit, a spinoff from the Electromagnetics Group of Ghent University and IMEC. Early contributors to the technology include Niels Faché, Jan Van Hese, Frank Libbrecht, Jeannick Sercu, Luc Vandormael, Mieke Herreman, Peter Kok, Tom Dhaene and Krist Blomme.

The company was acquired by Hewlett-Packard, later it became part of Agilent Technologies and since November 2014 it is part of Keysight Technologies EEsof division, the current owners.
