= Engineering optimization =

Techniques for optimization

Engineering optimization is the subject which uses optimization techniques to achieve design goals in engineering. It is sometimes referred to as design optimization.

== Topics ==
- structural design (including pressure vessel design and welded beam design)
- shape optimization
- topology optimization (including airfoils)
- inverse optimization (a subset of the inverse problem)
- processing planning
- product designs
- electromagnetic optimization
- space mapping
- aggressive space mapping
- yield-driven design
- optimization exploiting surrogates (surrogate model)
