= John Bandler =

Canadian engineer (1941–2023)

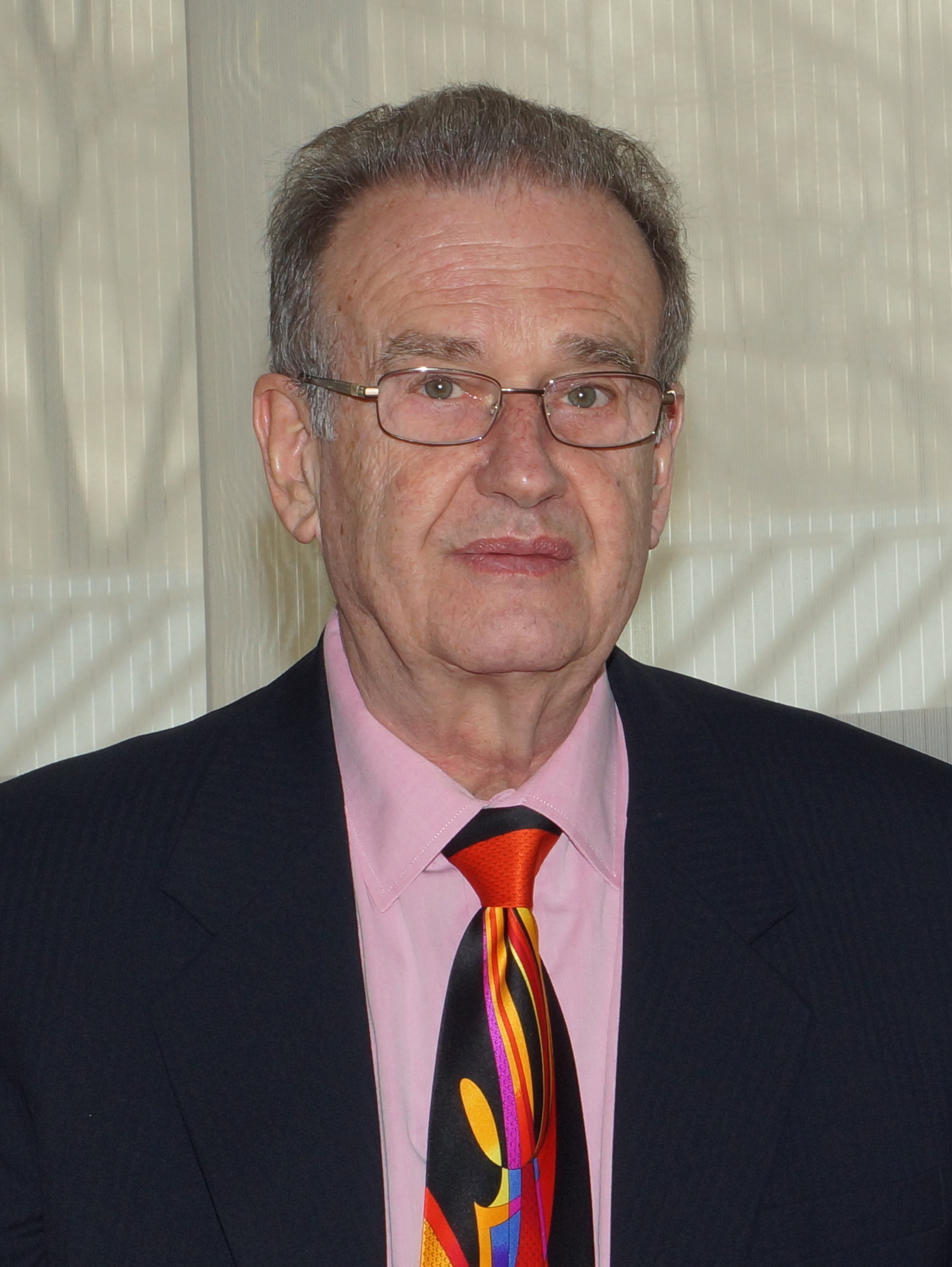
- Born: November 9, 1941; Jerusalem
- Died: September 28, 2023 (aged 81)
- Resting place: Burlington, Ontario
- Education: Imperial College of Science and Technology; University of London
- Known for: Space mapping; Computer-aided design; Electronic design automation; Microwave engineering; Mathematical optimization
- Scientific career
- Fields: Electrical Engineering, Microwaves, Optimization, CAD
- Workplaces: McMaster University, Bandler Corporation

John William Bandler OC FRSC FCAE (9 November 1941 – 28 September 2023) was a Canadian professor, engineer, entrepreneur, artist, speaker, playwright, and author of fiction and nonfiction. Bandler is known for his invention of space mapping technology and his contributions to device modeling, computer-aided design, microwave engineering, mathematical optimization, and yield-driven design.

== Early life and education ==
The only child of parents who escaped from Nazi-occupied Vienna to Cyprus, from where they were subsequently evacuated along with other Jewish refugees in 1941, Bandler was born in Jerusalem. After the War, his parents returned to Cyprus, where Bandler attended the Junior School in Nicosia, and, for a year, The English School in Nicosia. After a brief stay in Vienna in 1956, he left for England and completed his schooling in London.

He entered Imperial College of Science and Technology, University of London, in 1960, graduating in 1963 with First Class Honours in Electrical Engineering; and in 1967 with a Ph.D. in Microwaves. In 1976 he received his D.Sc. (Eng.) from the University of London in Microwaves, Computer-aided Design, and Optimization of Circuits and Systems.

== Career ==
Bandler worked as an engineer at Mullard Research Laboratories (later called Philips Research Laboratories) in Redhill, Surrey, England, from 1966 to 1967. He was a Postdoctoral Fellow and Sessional Lecturer at the University of Manitoba from 1967 to 1969.

Bandler joined McMaster University in 1969 as an assistant professor, becoming associate professor in 1971 and Professor in 1974. He served as chairman of the Department of Electrical Engineering from 1978 to 1979 and was Dean of the Faculty of Engineering from 1979 to 1981. During his time at McMaster, Bandler was coordinator of the Group on Simulation, Optimization and Control from 1973 until 1983, when he formed the Simulation Optimization Systems Research Laboratory. Dr. Bandler became a Professor Emeritus of McMaster University in 2000.

In 1983 Bandler founded Optimization Systems Associates Inc. (OSA), and the company was acquired by Hewlett-Packard in 1997. OSA technology became part of HP EEsof, passing on to Agilent Technologies and then to Keysight Technologies.

In 2012, a special session at the IEEE MTT-S International Microwave Symposium paid tribute to Bandler on the occasion of his 70th birthday for more than forty-five years of contributions to the field of microwave theory and techniques. Dr. Bandler was appointed Officer of the Order of Canada in 2016 for his contributions and has received several other awards for his work.

In 2013, Bandler reviewed the emergence and history of space mapping in IEEE Canadian Review. It spans two decades of development and engineering applications. In 2018, marking a quarter century since his discovery of space mapping this paper was re-set and reprinted in IEEE Microwave Magazine. In 2016, Rayas-Sánchez reviewed the state of the art of aggressive space mapping, a methodology pioneered by Bandler and his team. Bandler joined Rayas-Sánchez and Koziel in a review paper for a 2021 collection of invited papers marking the inaugural issue of the new open access IEEE Journal of Microwaves.

== Nontechnical ==
In 2000, Bandler turned his attention to creative writing. This led to literary, theatrical, and presentation skill endeavors, including theatrical productions and initiatives, and workshops on creativity, communication of scientific and academic research, and the Three Minute Thesis competition.

== Key honours ==
- Fellow of IEE (IET)
- Fellow of EIC
- Life Fellow of IEEE
- Fellow of the Royal Society of Canada
- Fellow of the Canadian Academy of Engineering

== Awards ==
- Automatic Radio Frequency Techniques Group (ARFTG) Automated Measurements Career Award (1994)
- IEEE MTT-S Microwave Application Award (2004)
- IEEE Canada A.G.L. McNaughton Gold Medal (2012)
- Queen Elizabeth II Diamond Jubilee Medal (2012)
- IEEE MTT-S Microwave Career Award (2013)
- McMaster University's Faculty of Engineering Research Achievement Award (2014)
- Appointed an Officer of the Order of Canada in 2016.
- McMaster University's 2018 Lifetime Innovator Award (2018)
- The OPEA Gold Medal from Professional Engineers Ontario (PEO) (2018)
- IEEE Electromagnetics Award (2023)

== Lectures ==
- "Human aspects of communication and persuasion: first impressions and subtext", rump session of IEEE MTT-S Int. Microwave Symposium (Montréal, QC, June 19, 2012).
- "From creativity to success via risk and setback: an insider's perspective", public lecture (McMaster University, Hamilton, ON, April 11, 2013).
- "Explain less, predict more", TEDx McMaster U Conference (McMaster University, Hamilton, ON, February 2, 2014).
- "Effective presentations", professional session: Preparing and Presenting Papers for MTT-S Journals and Conferences, IEEE MTT-S Int. Microwave Symp. (San Francisco, CA, May 25, 2016).
- "You, your slides and your posters: allies or foes?", public lecture (McMaster University, Hamilton, ON, November 4, 2016).
- John Bandler and Ana Kovacevic, "Clear, brief, engaging: your thesis in three minutes", public workshop (McMaster University, Hamilton, ON, January 24, 2017).
- J. W. Bandler, E. M. Kiley, and A. Kovacevic, "The art of effectively communicating complex, highly technical work in three minutes", IEEE MTT-S Webinar, March 28, 2017.
- J. W. Bandler, M. Ogrodnik, and D. Tajik, "Clear, brief, engaging: your thesis in three minutes", public workshop (McMaster University, Hamilton, ON, February 13, 2018).
- J. W. Bandler, E. M. Kiley, and D. Tajik, "Communicating your highly technical work to non-specialists in three short minutes", IEEE MTT-S Webinar, March 13, 2018.

== Plays ==
- "Christmas Eve at the Julibee Motel," Stage Play, (Hamilton Fringe Festival, Hamilton, ON, July 2010).
- "59 Minutes in the Maxwell Suite," Stage Play, (Hamilton Fringe Festival, Hamilton, ON, July 2011).
- "That The Multitude May Live," Stage Play, (Hamilton Fringe Festival, Hamilton, ON, July 2012).
- "The Trial of Naomi Verne," Stage Play, (Hamilton Fringe Festival, Hamilton, ON, July 2014).
- "Christmas Eve at the Julibee Motel," Stage Play, (Hamilton Fringe Festival, Hamilton, ON, July 2016).
