= PathWave Design =

American electronic design software company

- Formerly: EEsof
- Type: Division
- Industry: Electronic Design Automation Software
- Headquarters: Santa Rosa, California, United States
- Area served: Worldwide
- Products: RF & Microwave Design; Design & Simulation of High Speed Digital; Electronic System-Level (ESL) Design; Device Modeling
- Parent: Keysight
- Website: Official website

PathWave Design is a division of Keysight Technologies that was formerly called EEsof (/ˈiːsɒf/ EESOF; electronic engineering software). It is a provider of electronic design automation (EDA) software that helps engineers design products such as cellular phones, wireless networks, radar, satellite communications systems, and high-speed digital wireline infrastructure. Applications include electronic system level (ESL), high-speed digital, RF-Mixed signal, device modeling, RF and Microwave design for commercial wireless, aerospace, and defense markets.

== History ==
EEsof was founded in 1983 by an entrepreneur, Charles J. ("Chuck") Abronson, and a former Compact Software employee, Bill Childs.

EEsof's first products included high-frequency circuit simulators such as Touchstone and Libra. Although the Touchstone simulator itself is obsolete, its eponymous file format lives on. EEsof was acquired by Hewlett-Packard in 1993 and later spun out first as part of Agilent Technologies in 1999 and then as part of Keysight Technologies.

After the merger of HP and EEsof, the EEsof products were combined with the HP simulator, Microwave Design System (MDS). HP's entry, MDS, had been introduced in 1985. It was developed in-house and comprised a linear circuit simulator with integrated schematic capture and graphical layout with back-annotation, a first for RF EDA software. MDS was offered on UNIX workstations from HP, Sun, and Apollo as well on the PC. Before the introduction of MDS, HP had a marketing relationship with EEsof and sold Touchstone software on HP platforms such as the Series 200 (but not on the PC). The marketing relationship ended after the introduction of HP's MDS product.

The HP and EEsof harmonic balance simulators also had parallel lives before the merger. HP funded an employee Ken Kundert to do a Ph.D. at UC Berkeley. For his thesis, he developed Spectre, the first harmonic balance prototype. Some sources argue that since Berkeley had an open policy to all of its research work, EEsof was able to learn about the project and released a product, Libra, before HP was able to commercialize it in MDS. (Libra was a play on the Latin word libra for balance or scales). However, other sources say that Libra was developed completely independently. In any case, Kundert left HP to join Cadence Design Systems shortly after receiving his Ph.D. There he developed Spectre and SpectreRF.

In 1997, HP acquired Optimization Systems Associates (OSA), founded by John Bandler in 1983. OSA thereby became part of HP EEsof. OSA’s products included HarPE and OSA90/hope, featuring the world’s then most powerful harmonic balance optimizer, as well as Empipe, Empipe3D, EmpipeExpress, and empath. OSA's optimization technology and the OSA's Empipe family became the foundation of HFSS Designer and Momentum Optimization. This integration into HP’s electromagnetic product line consolidated a paradigm shift in HP's offering of their tools—a shift from analysis to design. Longer-term plans of the acquisition included leveraging OSA technology across HP's circuit- and device-simulation product lines.

On January 7, 2014, Agilent announced a plan to spin off its electronic measurement divisions, including EEsof, as a separate company, Keysight Technologies.

In 2019, Keysight started to phase out the EEsof brand in favor of their new PathWave Design branded TestOps toolchain, although the old brand is still used in some places.

== Products ==
- Platforms:
  - PathWave Advanced Design System (formerly EEsof ADS) – RF, microwave and high speed digital EDA software for wireless communications and networking, aerospace and defense, and signal integrity applications
  - PathWave EM Design (formerly EEsof EMPro or Electromagnetic Professional) - 3D EM platform that integrates 3D EM simulation and circuit simulation
  - PathWave RF Synthesis (formerly EEsof/Eagleware Genesys) - RF and microwave design for circuit board and subsystem designers
  - PathWave System Design (formerly EEsof/Eagleware/Elanix SystemVue) - Electronic system-level design tool for system architects and algorithm developers to change the physical layer (PHY) of wireless and aerospace/defense communications systems
  - PathWave RFIC Design (formerly EEsof GoldenGate and RF Design Environment) - RFIC/RF mixed-signal simulator
  - PathWave Device Modeling (formerly EEsof Integrated Circuit Characterization and Analysis Program (IC-CAP)), PathWave Model Builder (formerly MBP), PathWave Model QA (MQA), PathWave WaferPro - Device modeling, characterization, and validation
- EM solvers:
  - Momentum – 3D planar EM simulator that uses frequency domain Method of Moments (MoM) technology. Available with the PathWave ADS, RF Synthesis, and RFIC Design platforms.
  - FEM Element (formerly Electromagnetic Design System) – full-wave 3D simulator, frequency domain. Available with the PathWave ADS and EM Design platforms.
  - FDTD Element – full 3D, time-domain simulator to analyze 3D structures. Available with the PathWave EM Design platform.

== Mergers and acquisitions ==
The GoldenGate product was added with the Xpedion acquisition. The SystemVue and Genesys products were added as a result of the acquisition of Eagleware-Elanix in 2005., In turn, Eagleware-Elanix was a result of the merger of Eagleware and Elanix. Eagleware itself was founded in 1985 by Randy Rhea. The MBP and MQA platforms were added with EEsof's acquisition of Accelicon Technologies.

== See also ==
- List of EDA companies
- Comparison of EDA Software
- Optimization Systems Associates
