= Ansys HFSS =

Numerical simulation on electromagnets

- Website: www.ansys.com

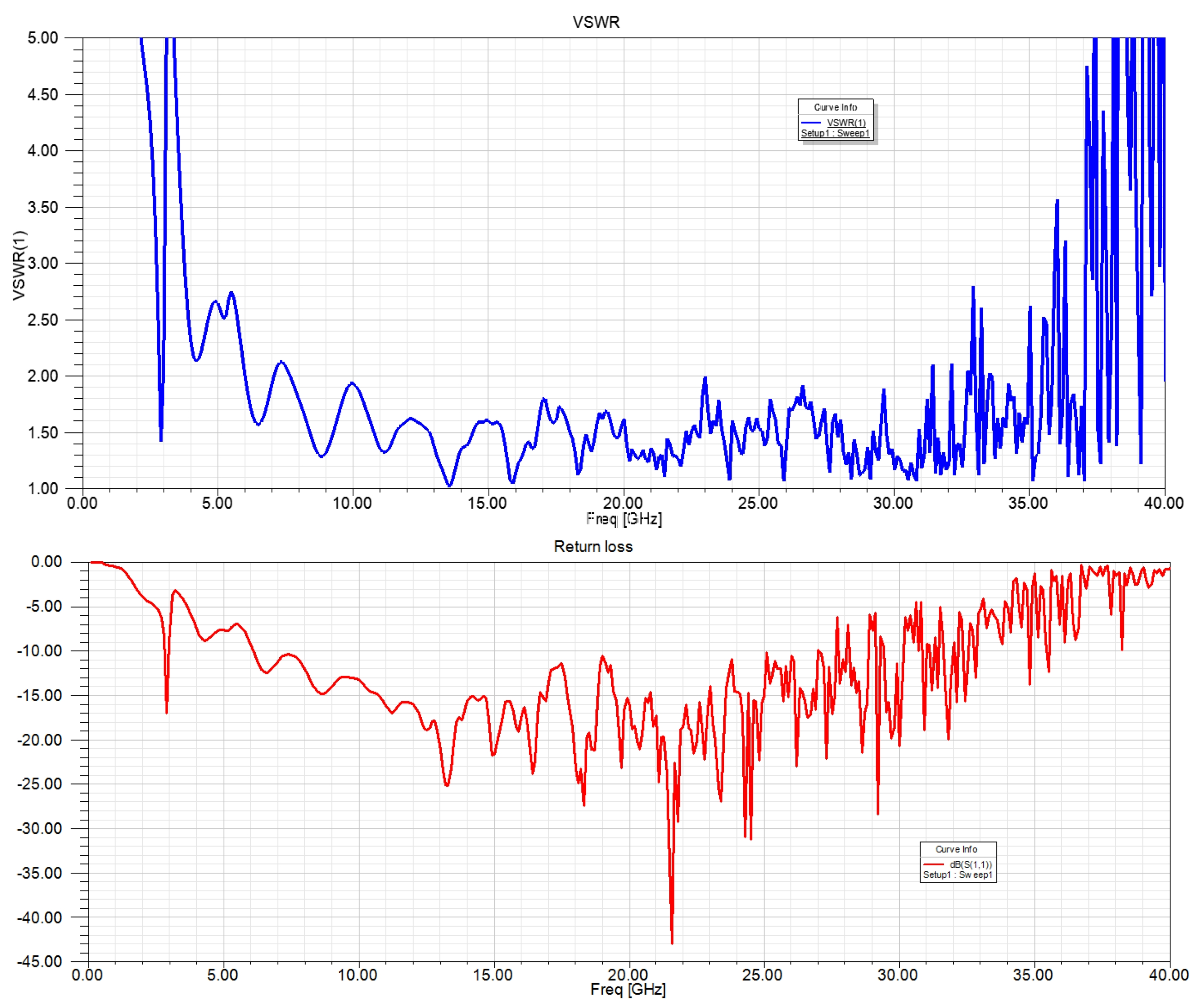
Example VSWR and return loss as simulated by HFSS. Parameters such as these are used to quantify and predict antenna performance, such as bandwidth.

Ansys HFSS (high-frequency structure simulator) is a commercial finite element method solver for electromagnetic (EM) structures from Ansys.

Engineers use Ansys HFSS primarily to design and simulate high-speed, high-frequency electronics in radar systems, communication systems, satellites, ADAS, microchips, printed circuit boards, IoT products, and other digital devices and RF devices. The solver has also been used to simulate the electromagnetic behavior of objects such as automobiles and aircraft. ANSYS HFSS allows system and circuit designers to simulate EM issues such as losses due to attenuation, coupling, radiation and reflection.

The benefits of simulating a circuit's high frequency behavior with high accuracy on a computer reduce the final testing and verification effort of the system as well as mitigating the necessity of building multiple costly prototypes, saving both time and money in product development.

== History ==
HFSS was originally developed by Professor Zoltan Cendes, Ph.D., and his students at Carnegie Mellon University. It was the first general purpose software product to solve arbitrary 3D EM field problems, including EM energy distribution and S parameters in complex structures.

In 1984, Dr. Cendes founded Ansoft Corporation to design and develop high performance EDA software. He served as its chairman and chief technology officer until 2008, when Ansys acquired Ansoft.

Ansoft originally sold HFSS as a stand-alone product under an agreement with Hewlett-Packard. It was also bundled into Ansoft products.

In 1997 Hewlett-Packard acquired Optimization Systems Associates Inc. (OSA), a company John Bandler founded in 1983. HP's acquisition was driven by HP's need for an optimization capability for HFSS. After various business relationships over the period 1996–2006, HP (which became Agilent EEsof EDA division) and Ansoft went their separate ways:

Over time, Ansys HFSS introduced a number of new technologies in computational EM simulation, including automatic adaptive mesh generation, tangential vector finite elements, transfinite elements, and reduced-order modeling.
