= FEM Element =

Finite element method solver for electromagnetic structures

FEM Element is a commercial finite element method solver for electromagnetic structures from EEsof. FEM Element can perform electromagnetic simulation of arbitrarily-shaped, passive three-dimensional structures.

It is aimed at providing 3D EM simulation to designers working on RF circuits, MMICs, PC boards, modules, and signal integrity applications. It provides a full 3D electromagnetic field solver, a solid modeling GUI, and fully automated meshing and convergence capabilities for modeling arbitrary 3D shapes such as connectors, machined parts, components, bond wires, antennas, and packages.

FEM Element is available with integration into Keysight EEsof's Advanced Design System (ADS) and EMPro platforms.

It was originally called Electromagnetic Design System (EMDS).

== See also ==
- Computational electromagnetics
