= Design optimization =

Design optimization is an engineering design methodology using a mathematical formulation of a design problem to support selection of the optimal design among many alternatives. Design optimization involves the following stages:

1. Variables: Describe the design alternatives
2. Objective: Elected functional combination of variables (to be maximized or minimized)
3. Constraints: Combination of Variables expressed as equalities or inequalities that must be satisfied for any acceptable design alternative
4. Feasibility: Values for set of variables that satisfies all constraints and minimizes/maximizes Objective.

== Design optimization problem ==
The formal mathematical (standard form) statement of the design optimization problem is

$$\begin{align}
&{\operatorname{minimize}}& & f(x) \\
&\operatorname{subject\;to}
& &h_i(x) = 0, \quad i = 1, \dots,m_1 \\
&&&g_j(x) \leq 0, \quad j = 1,\dots,m_2 \\
&\operatorname{and}
& &x \in X \subseteq R^n
\end{align}$$

where

- $x$ is a vector of n real-valued design variables $x_1, x_2, ..., x_n$
- $f(x)$ is the objective function
- $h_i(x)$ are $m_1$equality constraints
- $g_j(x)$ are $m_2$ inequality constraints
- $X$ is a set constraint that includes additional restrictions on $x$ besides those implied by the equality and inequality constraints.

The problem formulation stated above is a convention called the negative null form, since all constraint function are expressed as equalities and negative inequalities with zero on the right-hand side. This convention is used so that numerical algorithms developed to solve design optimization problems can assume a standard expression of the mathematical problem.

We can introduce the vector-valued functions

$$\begin{align}
&&&{h = (h_1,h_2,\dots,h_{m1})}\\
\operatorname{and}\\
&&&{g = (g_1, g_2,\dots, g_{m2})}
\end{align}$$

to rewrite the above statement in the compact expression

$$\begin{align}
&{\operatorname{minimize}}& & f(x) \\
&\operatorname{subject\;to}
& &h(x) = 0,\quad g(x) \leq 0,\quad x \in X \subseteq R^n\\
\end{align}$$

We call $h, g$ the set or system of (functional) constraints and $X$ the set constraint.

== Application ==
Design optimization applies the methods of mathematical optimization to design problem formulations and it is sometimes used interchangeably with the term engineering optimization. When the objective function f is a vector rather than a scalar, the problem becomes a multi-objective optimization one. If the design optimization problem has more than one mathematical solutions the methods of global optimization are used to identified the global optimum.

Optimization Checklist

- Problem Identification
- Initial Problem Statement
- Analysis Models
- Optimal Design Model
- Model Transformation
- Local Iterative Techniques
- Global Verification
- Final Review

A detailed and rigorous description of the stages and practical applications with examples can be found in the book Principles of Optimal Design.

Practical design optimization problems are typically solved numerically and many optimization software exist in academic and commercial forms. There are several domain-specific applications of design optimization posing their own specific challenges in formulating and solving the resulting problems; these include, shape optimization, wing-shape optimization, topology optimization, architectural design optimization, power optimization. Several books, articles and journal publications are listed below for reference.

One modern application of design optimization is structural design optimization (SDO) is in building and construction sector. SDO emphasizes automating and optimizing structural designs and dimensions to satisfy a variety of performance objectives. These advancements aim to optimize the configuration and dimensions of structures to optimize augmenting strength, minimize material usage, reduce costs, enhance energy efficiency, improve sustainability, and optimize several other performance criteria. Concurrently, structural design automation endeavors to streamline the design process, mitigate human errors, and enhance productivity through computer-based tools and optimization algorithms. Prominent practices and technologies in this domain include the parametric design, generative design, building information modelling (BIM) technology, machine learning (ML), and artificial intelligence (AI), as well as integrating finite element analysis (FEA) with simulation tools.

== Journals ==
- Journal of Engineering for Industry
- Journal of Mechanical Design
- Journal of Mechanisms, Transmissions, and Automation in Design
- Design Science
- Engineering Optimization
- Journal of Engineering Design
- Computer-Aided Design
- Journal of Optimization Theory and Applications
- Structural and Multidisciplinary Optimization
- Journal of Product Innovation Management
- International Journal of Research in Marketing

== See also ==
- Design Decisions Wiki (DDWiki) : Established by the Design Decisions Laboratory at Carnegie Mellon University in 2006 as a central resource for sharing information and tools to analyze and support decision-making
