= Microwave engineering =

Study and design of microwaves

Microwave engineering pertains to the study and design of microwave circuits, components, and systems. Fundamental principles are applied to analysis, design and measurement techniques in this field. The short wavelengths involved distinguish this discipline from electronic engineering. This is because there are different interactions with circuits, transmissions and propagation characteristics at microwave frequencies.

Some theories and devices that pertain to this field are antennas, radar, transmission lines, space based systems (remote sensing), measurements, microwave radiation hazards and safety measures.

During World War II, microwave engineering played a significant role in developing radar that could accurately locate enemy ships and planes with a focused beam of EM radiation. The foundations of this discipline are found in Maxwell's equations and the work of Heinrich Hertz, William Thomson's waveguide theory, J.C. Bose, the klystron from Russel and Varian Bross, as well as contributions from Perry Spencer, and others.

== The microwave domain ==
Microwave is a term used to identify electromagnetic waves above 10^{3} megahertz (1 Gigahertz) up to 300 Gigahertz because of the short physical wavelengths of these frequencies. Short wavelength energy offers distinct advantages in many applications. For instance, sufficient directivity can be obtained using relatively small antennas and low-power transmitters. These characteristics are ideal for use in both military and civilian radar and communication applications. Small antennas and other small components are made possible by microwave frequency applications. The size advantage can be considered as part of a solution to problems of space, or weight, or both. Microwave frequency usage is significant for the design of shipboard radar because it makes possible the detection of smaller targets. Microwave frequencies present special problems in transmission, generation, and circuit design that are not encountered at lower frequencies. Conventional circuit theory is based on voltages and currents, while microwave theory is based on electromagnetic fields.

Apparatus and techniques may be described qualitatively as "microwave" when the wavelengths of signals are roughly the same as the dimensions of the equipment, so that the lumped-element model is inaccurate. As a consequence, practical microwave technique tends to move away from the discrete resistors, capacitors, and inductors used with lower frequency radio waves. Instead, the distributed-element model and transmission-line theory are more useful methods for design and analysis. Open-wire and coaxial transmission lines give way to waveguides and stripline, and lumped-element tuned circuits are replaced by cavity resonators or resonant lines. Effects of reflection, polarization, scattering, diffraction and atmospheric absorption usually associated with visible light are of practical significance in the study of microwave propagation. The same equations of electromagnetic theory apply at all frequencies.

== Relevance ==
The microwave engineering discipline has become relevant as the microwave domain moves into the commercial sector, and no longer only applicable to 20th and 21st century military technologies. Inexpensive components and digital communications in the microwave domain have opened up areas pertinent to this discipline. Some of these areas are radar, satellite, wireless radio, optical communication, faster computer circuits, and collision avoidance radar.

=== Education ===
The University of Massachusetts Amherst provides research and educational programs in microwave remote sensing, antenna design and communications systems. Courses and project work are offered leading toward graduate degrees. Specialties include microwave and RF integrated circuit design, antenna engineering, computational electromagnetics, radiowave propagation, radar and remote sensing systems, image processing, and THz imaging.

Tufts University offers a Microwave and Wireless Engineering certificate program as part of its graduate studies programs. It can be applied toward a master's degree in electrical engineering. The student must have an appropriate bachelor's degree to enroll in this program.

Auburn University offers research for the microwave arena. Wireless Engineering Research and Education Center is one of three research centers. The university also offers a Bachelor of Wireless Engineering degree with a Wireless Electrical Engineering major.

Bradley University offers an undergraduate and a graduate degree in its Microwave and Wireless Engineering Program. It has an Advanced Microwave Laboratory, a Wireless Communication Laboratory and other facilities related to research.

=== Societies ===
The IEEE Microwave Theory and Techniques Society (MTT-S) "promotes the advancement of microwave theory and its applications...". The society also publishes peer reviewed journals, and one magazine.

=== Journals and other scholarly periodicals ===
There are peer reviewed journals and other scholarly periodicals that cover topics that pertains to microwave engineering: IEEE Transactions on Microwave Theory and Techniques, IEEE Microwave and Wireless Components Letters, Microwave Magazine, IET Microwaves, Antennas & Propagation, and Microwave Journal.

== See also ==
- Artificial dielectrics
- Microwave imaging
- Microwave transmission
- Radio-frequency engineering
- RF microwave CAE CAD
- Winston E. Kock
