= Waveguide rotary joint =

Signal to radar antenna coupler

Waveguide rotary joints or RF Rotary Joints are used in e. g. radar sensors to couple RF and/or other signals from transmitters and receivers of Primary Surveillance Radar sensors (PSR), Secondary Surveillance Radar (SSR) or Identification Friend or Foe (IFF) sensors to/from mechanically rotating or scanning radar antennas. The RF-signals can be provided to the waveguide rotary joint either via waveguides or coaxial-cables. In addition to RF-channels a waveguide rotary joint can have additional slip rings for coupling e.g. of DC-power supply, audio signals or optical signals. For example, pulsed L- and S-Band Air Traffic Control Radar sensors often combine a Primary Surveillance Radar sensor (PSR) with a peak pulse power of 2.5 MW and Secondary Surveillance Radar (SSR) sensor with a peak pulse power of ≥ 500 W or more. They often have two RF-channels each, which are operated 24/7 in parallel.

Depending on the required number of RF-channels, such as for different antenna diagrams, waveguide rotary joints can have up to 9 RF-channels. The RF-channels can have a peak power handling capacity between approximately 500 Watt up to 1.5 MW or more in the L- and S-Band.

Waveguide rotary joints are used in Radar systems at connections between two different types of RF waveguides. The symmetrical shape of the joints allows free rotation without performance degradation. In the rotating part, electrical continuity is achieved by λ/4-chokes eliminating metal contacts. The rotary joints can have both waveguide ports at a right angle to the rotational axis, "U-style", one waveguide port at a right angle and one in line, "L-style" or both waveguide ports in line. "I-style". Waveguide rotary joint modules are available for all frequency bands. Common materials for waveguide rotary joints include aluminum, brass, bronze, copper, and silver.
