= Keysight =

American technology company

Keysight Technologies, Inc.
- Type: Public
- Traded as: NYSE: KEYS; S&P 500 component
- Industry: Industry: Aerospace; Cybersecurity; Data center; Digital health; Electronic design automation; Electronic test equipment; Electronics; Quantum computing; Semiconductor industry; Smart grid; Wired communication; Wireless communication
- Predecessors: Electronic test and measurement division of HP and later Agilent Technologies
- Founded: 2014; 12 years ago
- Headquarters: Santa Rosa, California, U.S.
- Key people: Ron Nersesian (chairman); Satish Dhanasekaran (president and CEO)
- Products: AI data center infrastructure; Electronic design automation software; Electronic measurement equipment; Manufacturing inspection tools; Network testing and visibility systems; Semiconductor test and manufacturing systems
- Revenue: ▲US$5.38 billion (2025)
- Operating income: ▲US$876 million (2025)
- Net income: ▲US$850 million (2025)
- Total assets: ▲US$11.3 billion (2025)
- Total equity: ▲US$5.88 billion (2025)
- Number of employees: 16,800 (2025)
- Divisions: Design engineering software (PathWave Design); Electronic industrial solutions; Communication solutions; Network and security solutions
- Website: keysight.com
- Footnotes; Financials as of October 31, 2025.

Keysight Technologies, Inc. is a global company headquartered in Santa Rosa, California, that makes electronic testing equipment and software used to design, develop, and evaluate technologies. Its customers work in fields including mobile communications, aerospace and defense, automotive manufacturing, semiconductors, digital healthcare, and energy.

The company was formed in 2014 as a spin-off of Agilent Technologies, which inherited and rebranded the test and measurement product lines developed and produced, from the late 1930s to the turn of the millennium, by Hewlett-Packard. Its name is a combination of key- and -sight.

Satish Dhanasekaran took over as Keysight's CEO in 2022. Some other executives at Keysight Technologies include CTO Jay Alexander, CIO Daniel Krantz, CMO Marie Hattar, CSCOO Ingrid Estrada, CFO Neil Dougherty, and Corporate Controller Lisa Poole. The Chief People Officer (CPO) at Keysight is Jodi Juskie.

Through expansions and acquisitions, the S&P 500-indexed company has grown beyond its initial focus on oscilloscopes to produce electronic design automation (EDA) software, network visibility and cybersecurity solutions, manufacturing technology, and system-level simulation platforms.

Keysight works closely with more than 35 international engineering standards bodies to develop new standards and ensure accurate tests.

== Products ==
Insulation Resistance Multimeter Teardown

A digital storage oscilloscope

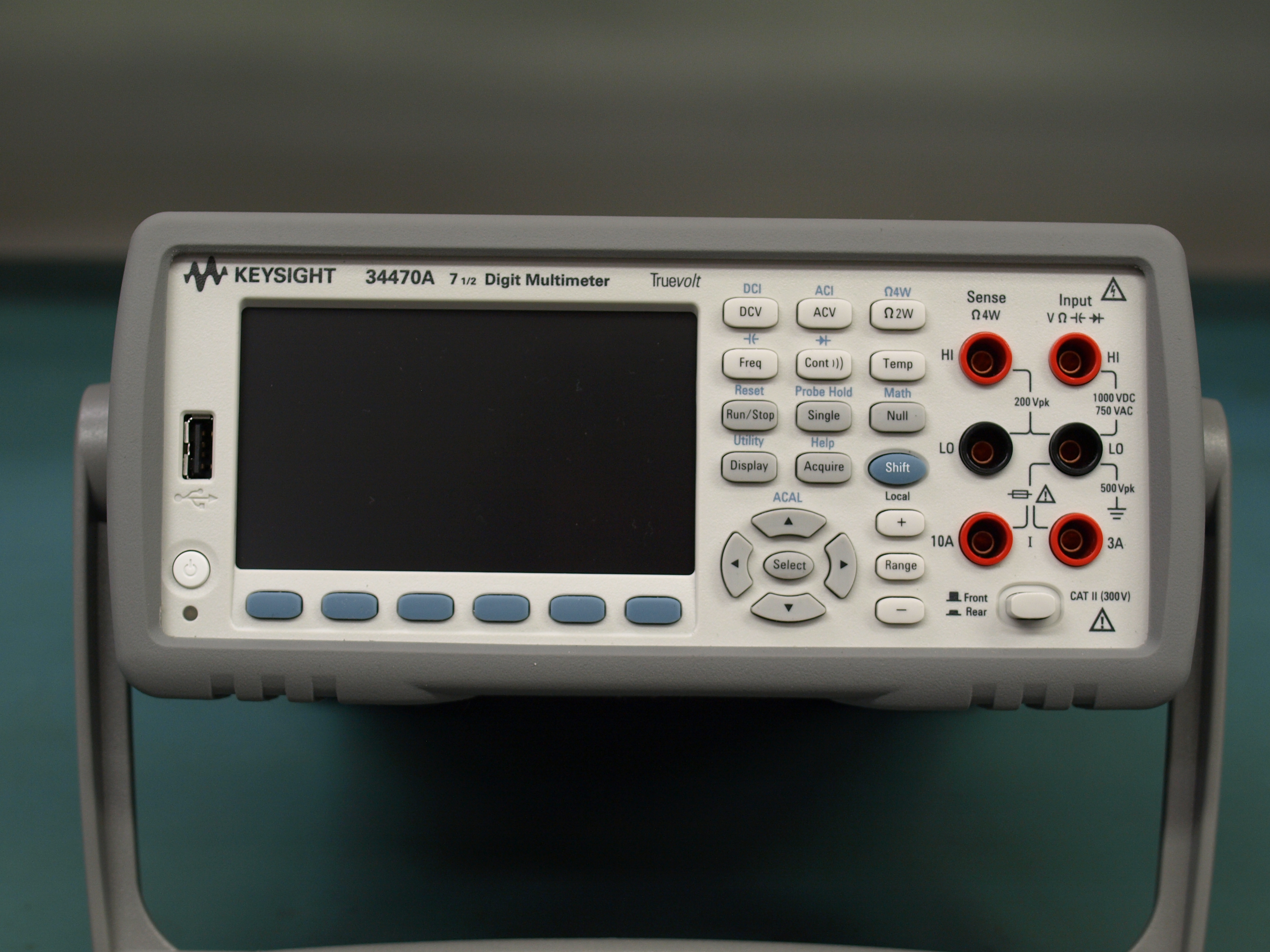
Digit multimeter

KeySight products

Keysight's products include engineering hardware and software for a variety of form factors including benchtop, modular, and field instrumentation for applications throughout the engineering lifecycle.

Keysight’s portfolio of test instruments includes:

- Digital test instruments
  - Oscilloscopes
  - Sampling oscilloscopes
  - Digital multimeters
  - Bit error rate testers (BERTs), digitizers, and data acquisition systems (DAQs)
  - Digital protocol and logic analyzers
  - Waveform and function generators
- Photonic and quantum instruments
  - Photonic test
  - Optical test
  - Quantum design, test, and control, including the world’s largest commercial Quantum Control System at the National Institute of Advanced Industrial Science and Technology G-QuAT in Japan
- Power test instruments, including high-power ATE system power supplies, including regenerative models, up to 12 kW
  - AC power supplies
  - DC power supplies
  - DC electronic loads
  - Power analyzers
  - Source measure units
  - EV charging and grid test systems
- Radio-frequency (RF) test instruments
  - LCR meters and impedance analyzers
  - Signal, spectrum, and wireless analyzers
  - Noise figure and phase noise analyzers
  - Signal sources
  - RF vector transceivers
  - Network analyzers
  - RF power meters

Keysight's design engineering software includes:

- PathWave electronic design automation engineering software
- Chiplet interconnect design
- Engineering data management
- Software quality engineering
- Computer aided engineering
- Optical design engineering
- Instrument measurement software
- Application software testing

Keysight's portfolio of emulators includes:

- IP traffic emulators
  - Ethernet traffic emulation
  - Network emulators
  - Interconnect test up to 3.2 Tbps
- Wireless emulators
  - Channel emulators
  - UE, RAN, and core emulators
  - Cellular device testing
  - WLAN and Internet of Things (IoT) testing
  - Over-the-air (OTA) testing
  - 5G emulators
- Automotive emulators
  - EV emulators
  - Autonomous drive testing
  - Automotive communications testing
- Security testing emulators
  - Security attack
  - Security device testing
  - Vulnerability assessment

Keysight’s manufacturing and operations products include:

- Network operations monitoring
  - Network visibility equipment
  - Network application monitoring
  - 5G NR base station test
  - Network modeling
  - Application and threat intelligence
- Semiconductor and manufacturing
  - Semiconductor test
  - In-circuit test for manufacturing

Additional products and solutions include:

- Laser interferometer and calibration
- Monolithic laser combiners
- Parametric test systems
- Monolithic microwave integrated circuit (MMIC) millimeter-wave and microwave devices
- Cyber training and security operations
- Automotive body in white (BIW) simulator
- AI data management, readiness, and compliance

Keysight serves a broad scope of advanced industries, including:

- Wireless telecommunications, 5G, and 6G
- Aerospace and defense
- Artificial intelligence, data centers, and wireline
- Digital healthcare
- Grid and energy, including EV charging
- Quantum and computing
- Semiconductor
- Automotive

Keysight also serves engineering education and universities, including the Institute of Electrical and Electronics Engineers (IEEE), with instruments, software, training, and labs. This includes its education-focused Keysight Digital Learning Suite.

== History ==
=== Acquisitions ===
In the same year of its spin-off from Agilent (2014), Keysight expanded its multi-vendor calibration offerings by finalizing the acquisition of Primary Standards North America. Keysight acquired British electronic measurement instrument maker Anite in 2015 for £388 million ($607 million). It also purchased U.K.-based calibration company Electroservices Enterprises the same year. In 2016, it acquired Signadyne, a quantum-focused modular measuring equipment company incubated by the ICFO (Institute of Photonic Sciences).

In 2017, Keysight acquired data technology company Ixia, including its network security solution BreakingPoint, for about $US1.6 billion in cash. It acquired Scienlab electronic systems GmbH, including its China division, in 2017 for $62 million. Expanding its calibrations services even further, the company acquired Liberty Calibration in 2017 and Melbourne-based Thales Calibration Services in 2018. Additionally, Keysight acquired Prisma Telecom Testing Srl in 2019 for $90 million.

The company acquired British software testing company Eggplant Software from The Carlyle Group for $330 million in 2020. In March of that year, it also acquired quantum computing instrument control and lab automation software company, Labber.

From 2019 to 2021, the company focused on 5G, introducing advanced products such as the Infiniium UXR-Series oscilloscopes. It acquired California-based Scalable Network Technologies in 2021 to expand its software and digital twin capabilities. The same year, Keysight also acquired Sanjole, a Hawaiian technology firm focused on testing wireless data networks, German EV charging test company Verisco GmbH, as well as quantum computing testing company Quantum Benchmark.

Keysight invested in quantum, high-speed digital/6G, and software-defined vehicle tech, respectively, in 2022 with acquisitions of QuaMotion, Micram Microelectronic GmbH, and NORDSYS.

In 2023, the company acquired France-based ESI Group for approximately $1 billion, as well as Cliosoft, Inc., data property management platform, for $85 million.

Keysight outbid Viavi Solutions in 2024 to acquire British telecommunications testing company Spirent for $1.5 billion. That June, the US Department of Justice required the company to divest three of Spirent's businesses prior to closing the sale, due to antitrust concerns. The sale closed October 15, 2025, including the regulatory required spin-off of three divisions.

Keysight acquired multiple other companies in 2024, including AnaPico, a Swiss RF and microwave test and measurement company, for $117 million. It also acquired Riscure, automated device and semiconductor security company, for $78 million, and Easics, a Belgian ASIC chip design services company.

Keysight acquired Synopsys Optical Solutions Group, an optical design and analysis software platform, from Synopsys, Inc., and PowerArtist, an RTL (Register-transfer level) power consumption analysis tool, from Ansys, Inc., in 2025. The Synopsys Optical Solutions Group acquisition expanded Keysight's capabilities in imaging systems design, illumination design, and automotive lighting design, plus virtual prototyping and electromagnetic photonic and optoelectronic simulation. PowerArtist expanded Keysight's role in semiconductor design with early-stage power analysis.

=== Controversies ===
On August 3, 2021, Keysight entered into a consent agreement with the Directorate of Defense Trade Controls, Bureau of Political-Military Affairs, Department of State ("DTCC") to resolve alleged violations of the Arms Export Control Act and the International Traffic in Arms Regulations ("ITAR"), after agreeing to a $6.6 million fine. On May 3, 2024, Keysight submitted a letter to the DTCC certifying that it had implemented all aspects of the consent agreement and that the company's compliance program was adequate to identify, prevent, detect, correct, and report violations of the ITAR.

In its 2024 Corporate Social Responsibility Progress Report, Keysight claimed successful completion of the consent agreement and the formal closure of the matter with the DTCC. It continues to provide ITAR data handling support for its customers with EDA (electronic design automation) support agreements.

== Research and development ==
From its launch in 2014 until 2020, Keysight increased its investment in R&D from approximately 12% to 16%, a percentage increase that represented almost a doubling of the investment in absolute dollars. In 2025, Keysight's research and development expenses reached $1.007B, a 9.58% increase over the previous year ($919M in 2024). Keysight's research and development budget has consistently increased annually since its 2014 spin-off from Agilent Technologies. Its current focus is on enabling technologies, system design, simulation, and measurement, with R&D distributed throughout the US, Singapore, India, Germany, Malaysia, Romania, China, Japan, Spain, United Kingdom, and France.

In 2024, Keysight collaborated with Google Quantum AI to introduce the industry's first quantum circuit simulation with flux quantization, representing a breakthrough in quantum computing and superconducting circuit design. This was followed in 2025 by Keysight's delivery of a quantum control system to the National Institute of Advanced Industrial Science and Technology (AIST) in Japan capable of supporting over 1,000 qubits, as part of the organizations’ ongoing quantum research.

Keysight focuses R&D efforts on AI data center infrastructure and networking technologies, including a 2025 survey report conducted by Heavy Reading on the infrastructure challenges facing AI advancements. Keysight collaborated with McGill University, Ciena, and Hyperlight on the industry's first demonstration of 448G PAM4 driverless optical transmission in 2025, which was also demonstrated at the European Exhibition on Optical Communications (ECOC) [link] and through collaboration with NTT Innovative Devices and Lumentum at an Optical Fiber Communications Conference (OFC) demonstration the same year.

Keysight is also advancing research in non-terrestrial networks (NTN) that integrate satellite and terrestrial communications for future 5G and 6G communications. In 2026, Keysight collaborated with Airbus UpNext on the SpaceRAN demonstrator to validate 5G NTN capabilities using software-defined satellite technology. The company also works with Samsung Electronics to validate new NR-NTN devices using its 5G Network Emulator, supporting satellite-to-mobile connectivity aligned with emerging low-Earth-orbit (LEO) constellations such as Starlink.

== Recognition ==
Keysight won the 2014 Global Frost & Sullivan award for market leadership with $300 million in instrumentation software revenue, with its R&D investment of 12% of revenue ($365 million in 2013) cited as an important factor.

In 2022, Keysight was ranked No. 46th on Fortune's 100 Best Companies to Work For list.n 2023, Keysight was recognized by Forbes as #5 of America's Best Midsize Employers and #123 of America's Most Cybersecure Companies. In 2024, it ranked Keysight #8 of America's Best Employers for Diversity. Time ranked the company #127th of 500 on its Worlds Most Sustainable Companies of 2025 list.

Forbes named Keysight #599 on its list of World's Best Employers 2025 and #188 on its list of the World's Most Trusted Companies in America 2026.

Keysight was named 2025 winner of the Excellence in Omnichannel Customer Experience Optimization Award by TSIA (Technology & Services Industry Association).

Keysight was named a Leader in the 2025 Gartner® Magic Quadrant™ for AI-Augmented Software Testing Tools for its Eggplant software including automated test design, real-time visual validation, and trusted deployment (Iron Bank Certification) capabilities.

Newsweek in 2026 named Keysight #13 of America's Most Responsible Companies and awarded it 4.5 out of 5 stars on its list of America's Greenest Companies.
