= Generalized randomized block design =

In randomized statistical experiments, generalized randomized block designs (GRBDs) are used to study the interaction between blocks and treatments. For a GRBD, each treatment is replicated at least two times in each block; this replication allows the estimation and testing of an interaction term in the linear model (without making parametric assumptions about a normal distribution for the error).

== Univariate response ==
=== GRBDs versus RCBDs: Replication and interaction ===
Like a randomized complete block design (RCBD), a GRBD is randomized. Within each block, treatments are randomly assigned to experimental units: this randomization is also independent between blocks. In a (classic) RCBD, however, there is no replication of treatments within blocks.

=== Two-way linear model: Blocks and treatments ===
The experimental design guides the formulation of an appropriate linear model. Without replication, the (classic) RCBD has a two-way linear-model with treatment- and block-effects but without a block-treatment interaction. Without replicates, this two-way linear-model that may be estimated and tested without making parametric assumptions (by using the randomization distribution, without using a normal distribution for the error). In the RCBD, the block-treatment interaction cannot be estimated using the randomization distribution; a fortiori there exists no "valid" (i.e. randomization-based) test for the block-treatment interaction in the analysis of variance (anova) of the RCBD.

The distinction between RCBDs and GRBDs has been ignored by some authors, and the ignorance regarding the GRCBD has been criticized by statisticians like Oscar Kempthorne and Sidney Addelman. The GRBD has the advantage that replication allows block-treatment interaction to be studied.

==== GRBDs when block-treatment interaction lacks interest ====
However, if block-treatment interaction is known to be negligible, then the experimental protocol may specify that the interaction terms be assumed to be zero and that their degrees of freedom be used for the error term. GRBD designs for models without interaction terms offer more degrees of freedom for testing treatment-effects than do RCBs with more blocks: An experimenter wanting to increase power may use a GRBD rather than RCB with additional blocks, when extra blocks-effects would lack genuine interest.

== Multivariate analysis ==
The GRBD has a real-number response. For vector responses, multivariate analysis considers similar two-way models with main effects and with interactions or errors. Without replicates, error terms are confounded with interaction, and only error is estimated. With replicates, interaction can be tested with the multivariate analysis of variance and coefficients in the linear model can be estimated without bias and with minimum variance (by using the least-squares method).

== Functional models for block-treatment interactions: Testing known forms of interaction ==
Non-replicated experiments are used by knowledgeable experimentalists when replications have prohibitive costs. When the block-design lacks replicates, interactions have been modeled. For example, Tukey's F-test for interaction (non-additivity) has been motivated by the multiplicative model of Mandel (1961); this model assumes that all treatment-block interactions are proportion to the product of the mean treatment-effect and the mean block-effect, where the proportionality constant is identical for all treatment-block combinations. Tukey's test is valid when Mandel's multiplicative model holds and when the errors independently follow a normal distribution.

Tukey's F-statistic for testing interaction has a distribution based on the randomized assignment of treatments to experimental units. When Mandel's multiplicative model holds, the F-statistics randomization distribution is closely approximated by the distribution of the F-statistic assuming a normal distribution for the error, according to the 1975 paper of Robinson.

The rejection of multiplicative interaction need not imply the rejection of non-multiplicative interaction, because there are many forms of interaction.

Generalizing earlier models for Tukey's test are the “bundle-of-straight lines” model of Mandel (1959) and the functional model of Milliken and Graybill (1970), which assumes that the interaction is a known function of the block and treatment main-effects. Other methods and heuristics for block-treatment interaction in unreplicated studies are surveyed in the monograph Milliken & Johnson (1989).

== See also ==
- Block design
- Complete block design
- Incomplete block design
- Randomized block design
- Randomization
- Randomized experiment
