= Social unit =

Social unit may refer to:

- Level of analysis, the location, size, or scale of a research target.
- Unit of analysis, the entity that frames what is being looked at in a study, or is the entity being studied as a whole.
- Social unit, a concept similar to social group developed by Muzafer Sherif
- Holon (philosophy), a whole that is part of a larger whole
