= B. V. Shah =

Babubhai V. Shah (born 6 February 1935) is an Indian professor of statistics. He was a chief scientist at Research Triangle Institute (RTI) from 1966 till he retired in 2003. He held several positions with RTI and Research Triangle Park for over four decades. B. V. Shah was responsible for the development of the SUDAAN software; to recognise his contributions, RTI has dedicated the current release of SUDAAN (9.0) to B. V. Shah. During that time, he was also part of the academia of biostatistics department, University of North Carolina at Chapel Hill in the United States.

Shah received his Ph.D. in statistics from University of Mumbai in 1960 under the guidance of professor M. C. Chakrabarti.

== Honours ==
- American Statistical Association, Fellow
- International Statistical Institute, Fellow
- Royal Statistical Society, Fellow

== Selected peer-reviewed publications ==
- 1958, On balancing in factorial experiments. Annals of Mathematical Statistics 29: 766–779.
- 1969. A note on predicting failures in a future time period. The Institute of Electrical and Electronics Engineers Transactions on Reliability, p. 203-204.
- 1979. Language design for survey data analysis. Bulletin of the International Statistical Institute, p. 273-292.
- (with R.W. Haley), 1981. Nosocomial infections in U.S. Hospitals, 1975–1976: estimated frequency by selected characteristics of patients. The American Journal of Medicine 70: 947–959

== Books and book chapters ==
- Myers, L.E., N. Adams, L. Kier, T.K. Rao, B. Shah, and L. Williams (1991). Microcomputer Software for Data Management and Statistical Analysis of the Ames/Salmonella Test. In Krewski, D. and C. Franklin (Eds.), Statistics in Toxicology. New York: Gordon and Breach Science Publishers, pp. 265–279.
- LaVange, L.M., B.V. Shah, B.G. Barnwell, and J.F. Killinger (1990). SUDAAN: A comprehensive package for survey data analysis. In G.E. Liepins and V.R.R. Uppuluri (Eds.), Data Quality Control. New York: Marcell Dekker, Inc., pp. 209–227.
- Shah, B.V. and R.P. Moore (1977). National Longitudinal Study of the High School Class of 1972: Sample Design Efficiency Study—Effects of Stratification, Clustering, and Unequal Weighting on the Variances of NLS Statistics. National Center for Education Statistics. Sponsored Reports Series, Stock No. 017-080-01692-3, GPO.
- Shah, B.V. (1974). On Mathematics of Population Simulation Models. In B. Dyke and J.W. MacCluer (Eds.), Computer Simulation in Human Population Studies. New York: Academic Press, Inc., pp. 421–434.
- Shah, B.V., A.V. Rao, Q.W. Lindsey, R.C. Bhavsar, D.G. Horvitz, and J.R. Batts (1974). The Evaluation of Four Alternative Family Planning Programs for Poland, a Less Developed Country. In B. Dyke and J.W. MacCluer (Eds.), Computer Simulation in Human Population Studies. New York: Academic Press, Inc., pp. 261–304.
- Shah, B.V., D.G. Horvitz, P.A. Lachenbruch, and F.G. Giesbrecht (1971). POPSIM, A Demographic Microsimulation Model. Carolina Population Center, University of North Carolina at Chapel Hill, Monograph Series 12, pp. 45–68.
