= Unit of observation =

Unit described by the data that one analyzes, in statistics

In statistics, a unit of observation (or individual) is the unit described by the data that one analyzes. A study may treat groups as a unit of observation within a broader unit of analysis, for example, drawing conclusions on group characteristics from data collected over a more general level.

For example, in a study of the demand for money, the unit of observation might be chosen as the individual person, with different observations for a given instant in time differing as to which particular individual they refer to; or the unit of observation might be the country, with different observations differing only in regard to the country they refer to.

== Unit of observation vs. unit of analysis ==
The unit of observation should not be confused with the unit of analysis. A study may have a differing unit of observation and unit of analysis: for example, in community research, the research design may collect data at the individual level of observation but the level of analysis might be at the neighborhood level, drawing conclusions on neighborhood characteristics from data collected from individuals. Together, the unit of observation and the level of analysis define the population of a research enterprise.

== Data point ==
A data point is a set of one or more observed values on a single instance of the unit of observation. For example, in a study of the determinants of money demand with the unit of observation being the individual, a data point might be the set of values of income, wealth, age of individual, and number of dependents of a specific person. Statistical inference about the population would be conducted using a statistical sample consisting of various such data points.

In addition, in statistical graphics, a "data point" may be an individual item with a statistical display; such points may relate to either a single member of a population or to a summary statistic calculated for a given subpopulation.

== Types of data ==
The measurements contained in a unit of observation are formally typed, where here type is used in a way compatible with datatype in computing; so that the type of measurement can specify whether the measurement results in a Boolean value from {yes, no}, an integer or real number, the identity of some category, or some vector or array.

The implication of point is often that the data may be plotted in a graphic display, but in many cases the data are processed numerically before that is done. In the context of statistical graphics, measured values for individuals or summary statistics for different subpopulations are displayed as separate symbols within a display; since such symbols can differ by shape, size and colour, a single data point within a display can convey multiple aspects of the set of measurements for an individual or subpopulation.

== See also ==
- Observation error
- Sample point
