= Statistical assembly =

In statistics, for example, in statistical quality control, a statistical assembly is a collection of parts or components that makes up a statistical unit. Thus a statistical unit, which would be the prime item of concern, is made of discrete components like organs or machine parts. The reliability of the statistical unit is, in part, determined by the reliability of the components in the statistical assembly and by their interactions.

Much of the observation of a statistical assembly requires special preparation of the unit, which demands that the intervention must not prejudice the observations. A simple version of this kind of research uses the stimulus-response model.

In other contexts, statistical assembly refers to the process of constructing a manufactured item that must be carefully specified to contain given amounts of nonuniformity within it.
