= D. Raghavarao =

American mathematician

Damaraju Raghavarao
- Born: 1938
- Died: February 6, 2013 (aged 74–75)
- Education: University of Mumbai
- Known for: Design of experiments Randomized block design Incomplete block design Block design Group-divisible designs Combinatorial design
- Scientific career
- Fields: Statistics; Mathematics
- Workplaces: Temple University, University of North Carolina, Chapel Hill
- Doctoral advisor: M. C. Chakrabarti

Damaraju Raghavarao (1938–2013) was an Indian-born statistician, formerly the Laura H. Carnell professor of statistics and chair of the department of statistics at Temple University in Philadelphia.

Raghavarao is an elected fellow of the Institute of Mathematical Statistics, American Statistical Association, and an elected member of The International Statistical Institute. He has been specialized in combinatorics and applications of experimental designs.

Raghavarao received his M.A. in mathematics from Nagpur University, India in 1957 and earned the gold medal. He earned his Ph.D. in statistics from the University of Mumbai in 1961 for his work in designs of experiments; his Ph.D. advisor was M. C. Chakrabarti. Raghavarao was a professor of statistics at Punjab Agricultural University, University of North Carolina at Chapel Hill, Cornell University, and University of Guelph before joining Temple University.

He died on February 6, 2013.

== Books ==
- Raghavarao, Damaraju (1971). Constructions and combinatorial problems in design of experiments. New York: Wiley. MR 0365935.
- Raghavarao, Damaraju (1988). Constructions and combinatorial problems in design of experiments (corrected reprint of the 1971 Wiley ed.). New York: Dover. MR 1102899.
- Raghavarao, Damaraju; Padgett, L. V. (2005). Block Designs: Analysis, Combinatorics and Applications. World Scientific. MR 2187913.
