= Wait list control group =

Type of participants in a medical study

A wait list control group, also called a wait list comparison, is a group of participants included in an outcome study that is assigned to a waiting list and receives intervention after the active treatment group. This control group serves as an untreated comparison group during the study, but eventually goes on to receive treatment at a later date. Wait list control groups are often used when it would be unethical to deny participants access to treatment, provided the wait is still shorter than that for routine services.

== See also ==
- Experimental design
- Scientific control
- Treatment and control groups
