= Oscar Kempthorne =

British statistician and geneticist (1919–2000)

- Born: January 31, 1919; St. Tudy, Cornwall, UK
- Died: November 15, 2000 (aged 81); Annapolis, Maryland, US
- Education: Clare College at Cambridge University
- Known for: Randomization analysis of randomized experiments "Iowa school" of analysis of variance Design of experiments Genetics
- Awards: President of the International Biometric Society 1961; President of the Institute of Mathematical Statistics 1984-5; Fellow of the American Statistical Association; Fellow of the AAAS; Honorary Fellow of the Royal Statistical Society
- Scientific career
- Fields: Statistics; Genetics; Philosophy of science
- Workplaces: Rothamsted Experimental Station; Iowa State University
- Academic advisors: Joseph Oscar Irwin
- Doctoral students: Charles Roy Henderson

Oscar Kempthorne (January 31, 1919 – November 15, 2000) was a British statistician and geneticist known for his research on randomization-analysis and the design of experiments, which had wide influence on research in agriculture, genetics, and other areas of science.

Born in St Tudy, Cornwall and educated in England, Kempthorne moved to the United States, where he was for many decades a professor of statistics at Iowa State University.

== Randomization analysis ==
Kempthorne developed a randomization-based approach to the statistical analysis of randomized experiments, which was expounded in pioneering textbooks and articles. Kempthorne's insistence on randomization followed the early writings of Ronald Fisher, especially on randomized experiments.

Kempthorne is the founder of the "Iowa school" of experimental design and analysis of variance. Kempthorne and many of his former doctoral students have often emphasized the use of the randomization distribution under the null hypothesis. Kempthorne was skeptical of "statistical models" (of populations), when such models are proposed by statisticians rather than created using objective randomization procedures.

Kempthorne's randomization-analysis has influenced the causal model of Donald Rubin; in turn, Rubin's randomization-based analysis and his work with Rosenbaum on propensity score matching influenced Kempthorne's analysis of covariance.

== Model-based analysis ==
Oscar Kempthorne was skeptical towards (and often critical of) model-based inference, particularly two influential alternatives: Kempthorne was skeptical of, first, neo-Fisherian statistics, which is inspired by the later writings of Ronald A. Fisher and by the contemporary writings of David R. Cox and John Nelder; neo-Fisherian statistics emphasizes likelihood functions of parameters.

Second, Kempthorne was skeptical of Bayesian statistics, which use not only likelihoods but also probability distributions on parameters. Nonetheless, while subjective probability and Bayesian inference were viewed skeptically by Kempthorne, Bayesian experimental design was defended. In the preface to his second volume with Hinkelmann (2004), Kempthorne wrote,

We strongly believe that design of experiment is a Bayesian experimentation process, ... one in which the experimenter approaches the experiment with some beliefs, to which he accommodates the design. (xxii)

== Bibliography ==
- Kempthorne, Oscar (1979). The Design and Analysis of Experiments (Corrected reprint of (1952) Wiley ed.). Robert E. Krieger. ISBN 0-88275-105-0. MR 0045368.
- Hinkelmann, Klaus; Kempthorne, Oscar (2008). Design and Analysis of Experiments. Vol. I, II (Second ed.). Wiley. ISBN 978-0-470-38551-7. MR 2363107.
  - Hinkelmann, Klaus; Kempthorne, Oscar (2008). Design and Analysis of Experiments, Volume I: Introduction to Experimental Design (2nd ed.). Wiley. ISBN 978-0-471-72756-9. MR 2363107.
  - Hinkelmann, Klaus; Kempthorne, Oscar (2005). Design and Analysis of Experiments, Volume 2: Advanced Experimental Design (First ed.). Wiley. ISBN 978-0-471-55177-5. MR 2129060.
- Kempthorne, Oscar (1992). "Intervention experiments, randomization and inference". In Malay Ghosh and Pramod K. Pathak (ed.). Current Issues in Statistical Inference—Essays in Honor of D. Basu. Institute of Mathematical Statistics Lecture Notes - Monograph Series. Hayward, CA: Institute for Mathematical Statistics. pp. 13–31. doi:10.1214/lnms/1215458836. ISBN 0-940600-24-2. MR 1194407.
- Kempthorne, Oscar (1957). An introduction to genetic statistics. New York: John Wiley and Sons, Inc. pp. xvii+545 pp. MR 0089119.
- Kempthorne, Oscar; Folks, Leroy (1971). Probability, statistics, and data analysis. Ames, Iowa: The Iowa State University Press. pp. xvii+555 pp. ISBN 0-8138-1285-2. MR 0321213.

== Writings about Oscar Kempthorne ==
- Klaus Hinkelmann, ed. (1984). Experimental design, statistical models, and genetic statistics: Essays in honor of Oscar Kempthorne. Statistics: Textbooks and Monographs. Vol. 50. New York: Marcel Dekker, Inc. pp. x+409 pp. ISBN 0-8247-7151-6. MR 0787258.
  - Bancroft, T. A. (1984). "The years 1950-1972". In Klaus Hinkelmann (ed.). Experimental design, statistical models, and genetic statistics. Statistics: Textbooks and Monographs. Vol. 50. New York: Marcel Dekker. pp. 3–7. ISBN 0-8247-7151-6. MR 0787259.
  - David, H. A. (1984). "The years 1972-1984". In Klaus Hinkelmann (ed.). Experimental design, statistical models, and genetic statistics. Statistics: Textbooks and Monographs. Vol. 50. New York: Marcel Dekker. pp. 9–13. ISBN 0-8247-7151-6. MR 0787260.
- Folks, J. Leroy (1995). "A Conversation with Oscar Kempthorne". Statistical Science. 10 (4): 321–336. doi:10.1214/ss/1177009867. JSTOR 2246132.
- Hinkelmann, Klaus (2001). "Remembering Oscar Kempthorne (1919–2000)". Statistical Science. 16 (2): 169–183. doi:10.1214/ss/1009213289. MR 1861071.
- Hinkelmann, Klaus. "Oscar Kempthorne 1919–2000". Statisticians in History. American Statistical Association.

== See also ==
- Analysis of variance
- Bayesian experimental design
- Biostatistics ("Biometry" or "Biometrics")
- Design of experiments
- Genetics
- Optimal design
- Philosophy of science
- Philosophy of statistics
- Random assignment
- Randomization
- Randomized block design
- Randomized clinical trial
