= Manohar Vartak =

Indian cominatoralist (1926–1997)

Manohar Narhar Vartak. [Kaka]
- Born: 29 November 1926; Mumbai, India
- Died: 21 June 1997
- Education: University of Mumbai
- Awards: Professor Emeritus, IIT, Bombay 1989
- Scientific career
- Fields: Statistics, mathematics
- Workplaces: Indian Institute of Technology
- Doctoral advisor: M. C. Chakrabarti

Manohar N. Vartak (29 November 1926 – 21 June 1997) was a professor emeritus of Mathematics and Statistics at the Indian Institute of Technology, Mumbai. Professor Vartak was one of founder members of the Department of Mathematics and the head of the department (1973–1977). He was superannuated in 1986. Vartak was specialized in balanced incomplete block designs, graph theory and operations research.

Vartak received his PhD (1961) in statistics from University of Mumbai under the guidance of professor M. C. Chakrabarti. Vartak guided numerous students for their PhDs.
