= M. C. Chakrabarti =

Indian statistician (died 1972)

- Born: 31 January 1915; British India
- Died: 22 June 1972; Bombay
- Known for: Design of experiments
- Scientific career
- Fields: Statistics
- Workplaces: University of Mumbai
- Doctoral students: Damaraju Raghavarao, B. V. Shah, M. N. Vartak

Mukunda Chandra Chakrabarti (31 January 1915 – 22 June 1972) was an Indian statistician. He was the founding head of the department of statistics at the University of Mumbai from 1948 until he died in 1972. The department of mathematics at University of Mumbai was established later in 1963 under the guidance of Professor S. S. Shrikhande.

Chakrabarti was known for his work in design of experiments. He guided a number of students for their Ph.D.s in statistics at the University of Mumbai. He was also associated with the University of Pune where his notes on design of experiments were taught and he used to come as external examiner for the practical examination.
