= SUDAAN =

Statistical software

SUDAAN (an acronym for "Survey Data Analysis") is a proprietary statistical software package for the analysis of correlated data, including correlated data encountered in complex sample surveys. SUDAAN originated in 1972 at RTI International (the trade name of Research Triangle Institute). Individual commercial licenses are sold for $1,460 a year, or $3,450 permanently.

== Current version ==
SUDAAN Release 11.0.3, released in May 2018, is a single program consisting of a family of thirteen analytic procedures used to analyze data from complex sample surveys and other observational and experimental studies involving repeated measures and cluster-correlated data. It provides estimates that account for complex design features of a study, including:

- unequally weighted or unweighted data
- stratification
- with- or without-replacement designs
- multistage and cluster designs
- repeated measures
- general cluster-correlation (e.g., correlation due to multiple measures taken from patients)
- multiply imputed analysis variables

== Example fields of use ==
SUDAAN enables the analysis of correlated data encountered in various fields of statistical research, including:

- survey research (RDD/telephone studies, area sample designs, cluster and stratified designs, list sampling)
- clinical trials (safety and efficacy data from multiple sites in multisite trials)
- group or community randomized trials
- observations on related family members
- toxicology (observations on littermates)
- multiple subjects within a cluster (patients within physician clinics or students within school classrooms)
- social statistics
- health outcomes research
- longitudinal data analyses
- repeated measures.

== Strengths ==
SUDAAN's strength lies in its ability to compute standard errors of ratio estimates, means, totals, regression coefficients, and other statistics in accordance with the sample design, greatly increasing the accuracy and validity of results. Many, if not most, data sets require attention to correlation and weighting, but few statistical software packages offer the user the opportunity to specify how data are correlated and weighted. For many years, SUDAAN remained the only broadly applicable software for analysis of correlated and weighted data. Currently Mplus offers similar capacities for a much broader set of models.

Currently, all nine of SUDAAN's analytic procedures offer three popular robust variance estimation methods:

- Taylor series linearization (generalized estimation equations [GEE] for regression models)
- jackknife (with or without user-specified replicate weights)
- balance repeated replication (BRR).

SUDAAN code is similar to SAS. Although more powerful than other statistical software, SUDAAN has a steep learning curve.

== Operating systems ==
SUDAAN functions on many computing platforms—including Windows 7/10, DOS, and LINUX—either as a stand-alone statistical software tool, or in SAS-callable format (SAS Version 9).
