= Anne Penfold Street =

Australian mathematician

Anne Penfold Street AM
- Born: 11 October 1932; Melbourne, Australia
- Died: 28 December 2016 (aged 84)
- Education: University of Melbourne
- Spouse: Norman Street
- Children: 2, including Deborah

Anne Penfold Street AM (11 October 1932 – 28 December 2016) was one of Australia's leading mathematicians, specialising in combinatorics. She was the third woman to become a mathematics professor in Australia, following Hanna Neumann and Cheryl Praeger. She was the author of several textbooks, and her work on sum-free sets became a standard reference for its subject matter. She helped found several important organizations in combinatorics, developed a researcher network, and supported young students with interest in mathematics.

== Early life and education ==
Anne Penfold Street was born on 11 October 1932 in Melbourne, the daughter of a medical researcher. She earned a bachelor's degree in chemistry from the University of Melbourne in 1954, while working there as a tutor in chemistry and also studying mathematics. She finished a master's degree in chemistry at Melbourne in 1956. During this time she married another Melbourne chemist, Norman Street, and in 1957 the Streets and their young daughter moved to the University of Illinois at Urbana–Champaign where Norman Street had a new job.

At Illinois, Street took up mathematics again. After moving to Mildura and then returning to Urbana, she completed her doctorate at the University of Illinois in 1966, with a dissertation on group theory supervised by Michio Suzuki.

== Career ==
After earning her doctorate, Street became a lecturer at the University of Queensland in 1967. While continuing to hold this position, she took a year of postdoctoral research at the University of Alberta, and on her return to Queensland in 1970 was promoted to senior lecturer, promoted again to reader in 1975, and given a personal chair as professor in 1985. At Queensland, she directed the Centre for Discrete Mathematics and Computing from its formation in 1998 until 2004.

She also held visiting positions at the University of Waterloo, University of Reading, University of Manitoba, University of Illinois at Urbana–Champaign, University of Western Australia, Auburn University, and University of Canterbury.

== Service to mathematics ==
Street became the founding editor-in-chief of the Australasian Journal of Combinatorics in 1990, and continued to serve as editor-in-chief until 2001.

She helped found the Institute of Combinatorics and its Applications (ICA), became one of its founding fellows, and served as an editor of the Bulletin of the ICA from its founding in 1991 until 2014. She was president of the ICA from 1996 to 2002.

She was the founding president of the Combinatorial Mathematics Society of Australasia, for the 1997–1998 term.

She also served as president of the Australian Mathematical Olympiad Committee from 1996 to 2001.

== Awards and honours ==
The Australian Mathematics Trust gave Street a B. H. Neumann Award for Excellence in Mathematics Enrichment in 1994.

The University of Waterloo gave her an honorary doctorate in 1996.

In 1999, the Combinatorial Mathematics Society of Australasia gave her their inaugural medal for outstanding service.

She was named a Member of the Order of Australia in the 2014 Queen's Birthday Honours, primarily for her work with the Australian Mathematics Trust and the Australian Mathematical Olympiad Committee.

== Personal life ==
Street's daughter, Deborah J. Street, is a statistician at the University of Technology Sydney, and the coauthor (with her mother) of a book on the combinatorial design of experiments. Her son, Tony Street, is a researcher in Islamic Studies at the University of Cambridge.

== Death and legacy ==
Street died on 28 December 2016.

The Anne Penfold Street Awards of the Australian Mathematical Society, an initiative to provide family care for travelling mathematicians, are named after her.

Beginning in 2016, the best student paper award from the annual Australasian Conference on Combinatorial Mathematics and Combinatorial Computing (ACCMCC) became known as the CMSA Anne Penfold Street Student Prize.

== Books ==
- Combinatorics: Room Squares, Sum-Free Sets, Hadamard Matrices (with W. D. Wallis and Jennifer Seberry Wallis, Springer, Lecture Notes in Mathematics 292, 1972)
- Combinatorial Theory: An Introduction (with W. D. Wallis, Charles Babbage Research Centre, 1977)
- Combinatorics: A First Course (with W. D. Wallis, Charles Babbage Research Centre, 1982)
- Combinatorics of Experimental Design (with Deborah J. Street, Oxford University Press, 1987)
- Discrete Mathematics: Logic and Structures (with Elizabeth J. Billington, Melbourne: Longman Cheshire, 1990; 2nd ed., 1993)
