= Deborah Street =

Australian statistician

Deborah Street FASSA (born April 1957) is an Australian statistician known for her research in the design of experiments. She is a professor at the University of Technology Sydney, where she is a core member of the Centre for Health Economics Research and Evaluation (CHERE).

== Early life and education ==
Street is the daughter of mathematician Anne Penfold Street and physical chemist Norman Street. She was born in Melbourne but spent most of her first ten years living in the US; her family returned to Australia in 1967, to Brisbane.

She completed a Ph.D. in 1981 at the University of Sydney, under the supervision of Jennifer Seberry. Her dissertation was Cyclotomy and Designs.

Street was elected a Fellow of the Academy of the Social Sciences in Australia in 2022.

== Books ==
Street is the co-author of books including:

- Combinatorics of Experimental Design (with Anne Penfold Street, Oxford University Press, 1987)
- The Construction of Optimal Stated Choice Experiments: Theory and Methods (with Leonie Burgess, Wiley, 2007)
