= Unit of analysis =

Major entity that is being analyzed in a study

The unit of analysis is the entity that frames what is being looked at in a study, or is the entity being studied as a whole. In social science research, at the macro level, the most commonly referenced unit of analysis, considered to be a society is the state (polity) (i.e. country). At meso level, common units of observation include groups, organizations, and institutions, and at micro level, individual people.

== Unit of analysis vs the level of analysis ==
Unit of analysis is closely related to the term level of analysis, and some scholars have used them interchangingly, while others argue for a need for distinction. Ahmet Nuri Yurdusev wrote that "the level of analysis is more of an issue related to the framework/context of analysis and the level at which one conducts one's analysis, whereas the question of the unit of analysis is a matter of the 'actor' or the 'entity' to be studied". Manasseh Wepundi noted the difference between "the unit of analysis, that is the phenomenon about which generalizations are to be made, that which each 'case' in the data file represents and the level of analysis, that is, the manner in which the units of analysis can be arrayed on a continuum from the very small (micro) to very large (macro) levels."

== Unit of analysis vs unit of observation ==
The unit of analysis should also not be confused with the unit of observation. The unit of observation is a subset of the unit of analysis. A study may have a differing unit of observation and unit of analysis: for example, in community research, the research design may collect data at the individual level of observation but the level of analysis might be at the neighborhood level, drawing conclusions on neighborhood characteristics from data collected from individuals. Together, the unit of observation and the level of analysis define the population of a research enterprise.

== Countries as units of analysis ==
Dependency theory and world-systems analysis challenged the treatment of countries as societies or units of analysis and the assumption that each country develops separately through stages from agrarian to industrial, from authoritarian to democratic, from backwards to advanced, by raising historical evidence. The development of an uneven division of labor (world-economy) shows factors of causality that account for changes within countries indicating that countries are part of a larger society or historical social system with systemic patterns that account for global inequality.

The literature of international relations provides a good example of units of analysis system.

== See also ==
- Statistical unit
