= Combinatorics of Experimental Design =

1987 mathematics textbook

- Author: Anne Penfold Street, Deborah Street
- Language: English
- Genre: Mathematics
- Publisher: Oxford University Press
- Publication date: 1987

Combinatorics of Experimental Design is a textbook on the design of experiments, a subject that connects applications in statistics to the theory of combinatorial mathematics. It was written by mathematician Anne Penfold Street and her daughter, statistician Deborah Street, and published in 1987 by the Oxford University Press under their Clarendon Press imprint.

== Topics ==
The book has 15 chapters. Its introductory chapter covers the history and applications of experimental designs, it has five chapters on balanced incomplete block designs and their existence, and three on Latin squares and mutually orthogonal Latin squares. Other chapters cover resolvable block designs, finite geometry, symmetric and asymmetric factorial designs, and partially balanced incomplete block designs.

After this standard material, the remaining two chapters cover less-standard material. The penultimate chapter covers miscellaneous types of designs including circular block designs, incomplete Latin squares, and serially balanced sequences. The final chapter describes specialized designs for agricultural applications. The coverage of the topics in the book includes examples, clearly written proofs, historical references, and exercises for students.

== Audience and reception ==
Although intended as an advanced undergraduate textbook, this book can also be used as a graduate text, or as a reference for researchers. Its main prerequisites are some knowledge of linear algebra and linear models, but some topics touch on abstract algebra and number theory as well.

Although disappointed by the omission of some topics, reviewer D. V. Chopra writes that the book "succeeds remarkably well" in connecting the separate worlds of combinatorics and statistics. And Marshall Hall, reviewing the book, called it "very readable" and "very satisfying".

== Related books ==
Other books on the combinatorics of experimental design include Statistical Design and Analysis of Experiments (John, 1971), Constructions and Combinatorial Problems in Design of Experiments (Rao, 1971), Design Theory (Beth, Jungnickel, and Lenz, 1985), and Combinatorial Theory and Statistical Design (Constantine, 1987). Compared to these, Combinatorics of Experimental Design makes the combinatorial aspects of the subjects more accessible to statisticians, and its last two chapters contain material not covered by the other books. However, it omits several other topics that were included in Rao's more comprehensive text.

== See also ==
- The Design of Experiments (1935), by Ronald Fisher
