= Treatment and control groups =

Part of experimental design

In the design of experiments, hypotheses are applied to experimental units in a treatment group. In comparative experiments, members of a control group receive a standard treatment, a placebo, or no treatment at all. There may be more than one treatment group, more than one control group, or both.

A placebo control group can be used to support a double-blind study, in which some subjects are given an ineffective treatment (in medical studies typically a sugar pill) to minimize differences in the experiences of subjects in the different groups; this is done in a way that ensures no participant in the experiment (subject or experimenter) knows to which group each subject belongs. In such cases, a third, non-treatment control group can be used to measure the placebo effect directly, as the difference between the responses of placebo subjects and untreated subjects, perhaps paired by age group or other factors (such as being twins).

For the conclusions drawn from the results of an experiment to have validity, it is essential that the items or patients assigned to treatment and control groups be representative of the same population. In some experiments, such as many in agriculture or psychology, this can be achieved by randomly assigning items from a common population to one of the treatment and control groups. In studies of twins involving just one treatment group and a control group, it is statistically efficient to do this random assignment separately for each pair of twins, so that one is in the treatment group and one in the control group.In some medical studies, where it may be unethical not to treat patients who present with symptoms, controls may be given a standard treatment, rather than no treatment at all. An alternative is to select controls from a wider population, provided that this population is well-defined and that those presenting with symptoms at the clinic are representative of those in the wider population. Another method to reduce ethical concerns would be to test early-onset symptoms, with enough time later to offer real treatments to the control subjects, and let those subjects know the first treatments are "experimental" and might not be as effective as later treatments, again with the understanding there would be ample time to try other remedies.

== Relevance ==
A clinical control group can be a placebo arm or it can involve an old method used to address a clinical outcome when testing a new idea. For example in a study released by the British Medical Journal, in 1995 studying the effects of strict blood pressure control versus more relaxed blood pressure control in diabetic patients, the clinical control group was the diabetic patients that did not receive tight blood pressure control. In order to qualify for the study, the patients had to meet the inclusion criteria and not match the exclusion criteria. Once the study population was determined, the patients were placed in either the experimental group (strict blood pressure control <150/80mmHg) versus non strict blood pressure control (<180/110). There were a wide variety of ending points for patients such as death, myocardial infarction, stroke, etc. The study was stopped before completion because strict blood pressure control was so much superior to the clinical control group which had relaxed blood pressure control. The study was no longer considered ethical because tight blood pressure control was so much more effective at preventing end points that the clinical control group had to be discontinued. The clinical control group is not always a placebo group. Sometimes the clinical control group can involve comparing a new drug to an older drug in a superiority trial. In a superiority trial, the clinical control group is the older medication rather than the new medication. For example in the ALLHAT trial, Thiazide diuretics were demonstrated to be superior to calcium channel blockers or angiotensin-converting enzyme inhibitors in reducing cardiovascular events in high risk patients with hypertension. In the ALLHAT study, the clinical control group was not a placebo it was ACEI or Calcium Channel Blockers. Overall, clinical control groups can either be a placebo or an old standard of therapy.

== See also ==
- Scientific control
- Wait list control group
- Blocking (statistics)
- Hawthorne effect
- Lessebo effect
