= Random assignment =

Process for allocating experimental subjects to groups

Random assignment or random placement is an experimental technique for assigning human participants or animal subjects to different groups in an experiment (e.g., a treatment group versus a control group) using randomization, such as by a chance procedure (e.g., flipping a coin) or a random number generator. This ensures that each participant or subject has an equal chance of being placed in any group. Random assignment of participants helps to ensure that any differences between and within the groups are not systematic at the outset of the experiment. Thus, any differences between groups recorded at the end of the experiment can be more confidently attributed to the experimental procedures or treatment.

Random assignment, blinding, and controlling are key aspects of the design of experiments because they help ensure that the results are not spurious or deceptive via confounding. This is why randomized controlled trials are vital in clinical research, especially ones that can be double-blinded and placebo-controlled.

Mathematically, there are distinctions between randomization, pseudorandomization, and quasirandomization, as well as between random number generators and pseudorandom number generators. How much these differences matter in experiments (such as clinical trials) is a matter of trial design and statistical rigor, which affect evidence grading. Studies done with pseudo- or quasirandomization are usually given nearly the same weight as those with true randomization but are viewed with a bit more caution.

== Benefits of random assignment ==
Imagine an experiment in which the participants are not randomly assigned; perhaps the first 10 people to arrive are assigned to the Experimental group, and the last 10 people to arrive are assigned to the Control group. At the end of the experiment, the experimenter finds differences between the Experimental group and the Control group, and claims these differences are a result of the experimental procedure. However, they also may be due to some other preexisting attribute of the participants, e.g. people who arrive early versus people who arrive late.

Imagine the experimenter instead uses a coin flip to randomly assign participants. If the coin lands heads-up, the participant is assigned to the Experimental group. If the coin lands tails-up, the participant is assigned to the Control group. At the end of the experiment, the experimenter finds differences between the Experimental group and the Control group. Because each participant had an equal chance of being placed in any group, it is unlikely the differences could be attributable to some other preexisting attribute of the participant, e.g. those who arrived on time versus late.

== Potential issues ==
Random assignment does not guarantee that the groups are matched or equivalent. The groups may still differ on some preexisting attribute due to chance. The use of random assignment cannot eliminate this possibility, but it greatly reduces it.

To express this same idea statistically - If a randomly assigned group is compared to the mean it may be discovered that they differ, even though they were assigned from the same group. If a test of statistical significance is applied to randomly assigned groups to test the difference between sample means against the null hypothesis that they are equal to the same population mean (i.e., population mean of differences = 0), given the probability distribution, the null hypothesis will sometimes be "rejected," that is, deemed not plausible. That is, the groups will be sufficiently different on the variable tested to conclude statistically that they did not come from the same population, even though, procedurally, they were assigned from the same total group. For example, using random assignment may create an assignment to groups that has 20 blue-eyed people and 5 brown-eyed people in one group. This is a rare event under random assignment, but it could happen, and when it does it might add some doubt to the causal agent in the experimental hypothesis.

== Random sampling ==
Random sampling is a related, but distinct, process. Random sampling is recruiting participants in a way that they represent a larger population. Because most basic statistical tests require the hypothesis of an independent randomly sampled population, random assignment is the desired assignment method because it provides control for all attributes of the members of the samples—in contrast to matching on only one or more variables—and provides the mathematical basis for estimating the likelihood of group equivalence for characteristics one is interested in, both for pretreatment checks on equivalence and the evaluation of post treatment results using inferential statistics. More advanced statistical modeling can be used to adapt the inference to the sampling method.

== History ==
Randomization was emphasized in the theory of statistical inference of Charles S. Peirce in "Illustrations of the Logic of Science" (1877–1878) and "A Theory of Probable Inference" (1883). Peirce applied randomization in the Peirce-Jastrow experiment on weight perception.

Charles S. Peirce randomly assigned volunteers to a blinded, repeated-measures design to evaluate their ability to discriminate weights. Peirce's experiment inspired other researchers in psychology and education, which developed a research tradition of randomized experiments in laboratories and specialized textbooks in the eighteen-hundreds.

Jerzy Neyman advocated randomization in survey sampling (1934) and in experiments (1923). Ronald A. Fisher advocated randomization in his book on experimental design (1935).

== See also ==
- Asymptotic theory (statistics)
