= University of Toronto Faculty of Applied Science and Engineering =

Engineering school of the University of Toronto

Coordinates: 43°39′36″N 79°23′41″W

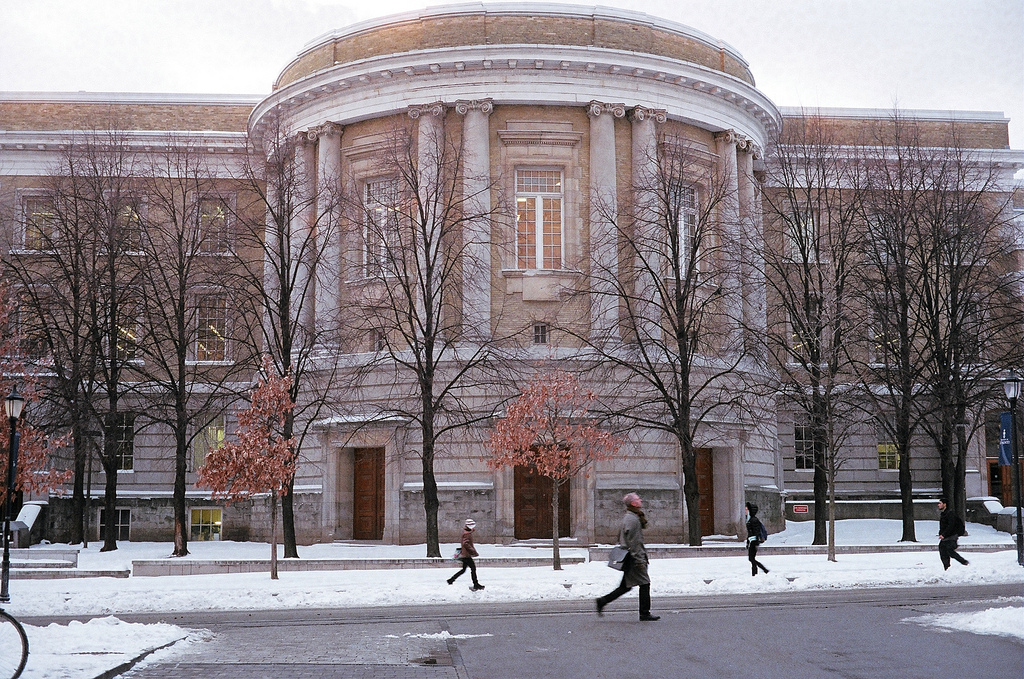
- The Sandford Fleming Building, the traditional main building of the faculty
- Former name: School of Practical Science (1873–1906)
- Type: Public engineering school
- Established: 1873; 153 years ago
- Parent institution: University of Toronto
- Dean: Christopher Yip
- Academic staff: 280 (2023)
- Administrative staff: 345 (2018)
- Undergraduates: 5,628 (2023)
- Postgraduates: 3,011 (2023)
- Location: Toronto, Ontario, Canada
- Mascot: Ye Olde Mighty Skule Cannon
- Website: engineering.utoronto.ca

The Faculty of Applied Science and Engineering (branded as U of T Engineering) is the engineering school of the University of Toronto, a public research university in Ontario, Canada. It was founded in 1873 and currently is housed in 15 facilities on the southern side of the St. George campus and three buildings located across downtown Toronto. The faculty offers undergraduate, master's, and doctoral degrees in engineering sciences on the St. George campus, and select graduate programs on the Mississauga campus. It also maintains a partnership with the Rotman School of Management for a dual-degree program.

Within the university, it is known by the nickname of Skule and has the oldest university engineering society in Canada.

== History ==
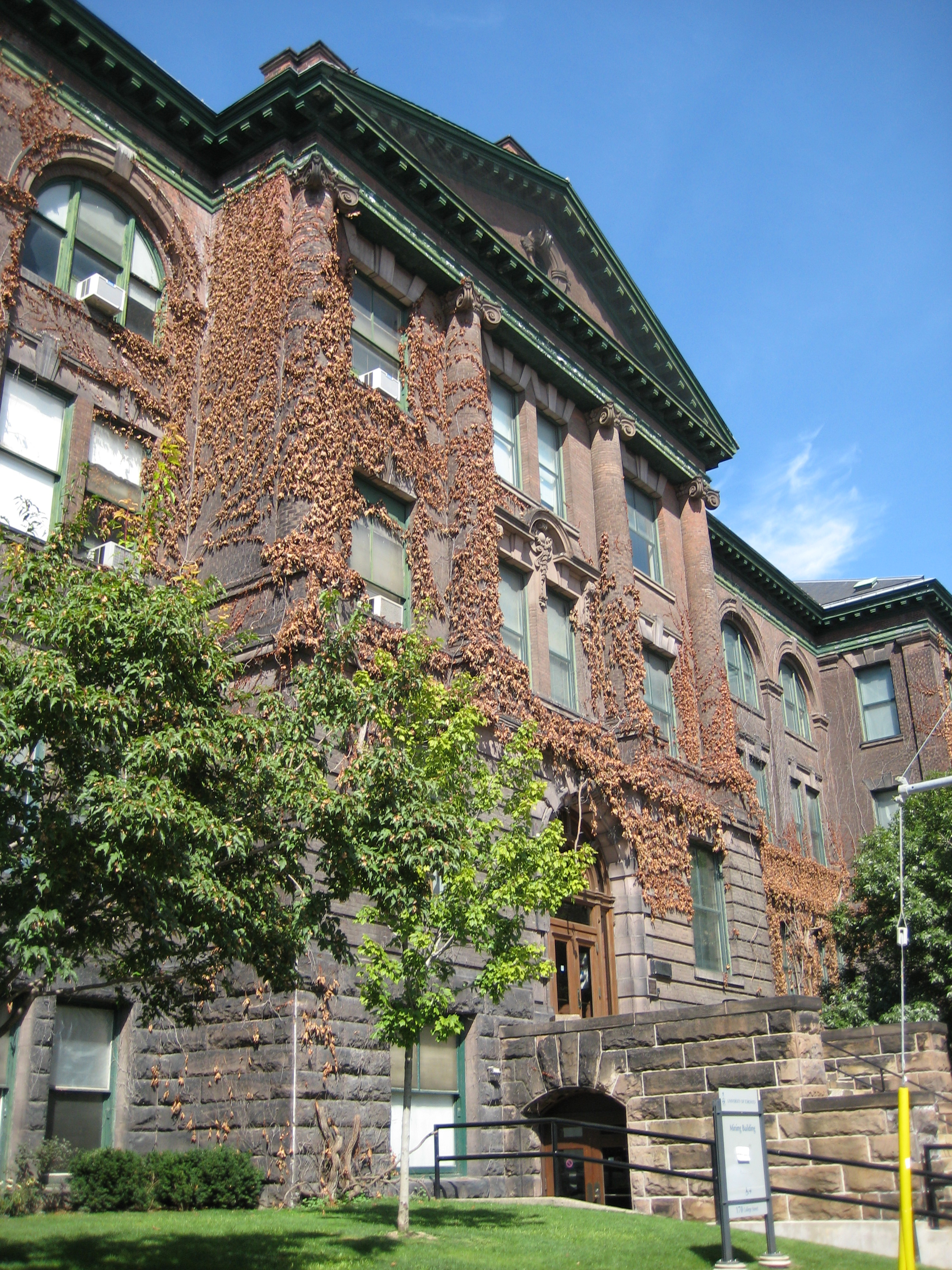
The Mining Building

The School of Practical Science (SPS) was created in 1873 by an act of the Legislative Assembly of Ontario. The school was to serve the needs of a growing economy at a time marked by rapidly evolving sciences and technologies. In 1878, the school enrolled its first class for a three-year curriculum in the subjects of mining, engineering, mechanics and manufacturing.

The school was established as an affiliate of the University of Toronto, but operated as a separate institution. The first classes were held in a red-brick building that was known as the "Little Red Skulehouse" by attending students.

The school was renamed as the Faculty of Applied Science and Engineering on June 20, 1906, when it officially became part of the university.

In 1949, the University of Toronto Institute for Aerospace Studies opened for graduate studies and research in aeronautical and space sciences.

In 1962, the Institute of Biomedical Electronics (now Institute of Biomedical Engineering) was established for graduate studies. The original Skulehouse was finally demolished in 1966, by which time the faculty had already expanded to occupy a dozen other buildings that formed an engineering precinct in the southern part of the St. George campus.

The Bahen Centre for Information Technology was completed in 2002 to meet the growing needs of the university’s computer science, electrical and computer engineering programs. Designed by Diamond Schmitt Architects, the $111 million facility contains 20,000 gross square metres and is named for John Bahen, the president of Peter Kiewit and Sons. The centre was described by Canadian Architect magazine as "a complex interweaving of urbanity, public space and sustainability", and it won the Ontario Association of Architects Award, the City of Toronto Architecture and Urban Design Award, and bronze in the environmental category of the National Post Design Exchange Award.

== Academics ==
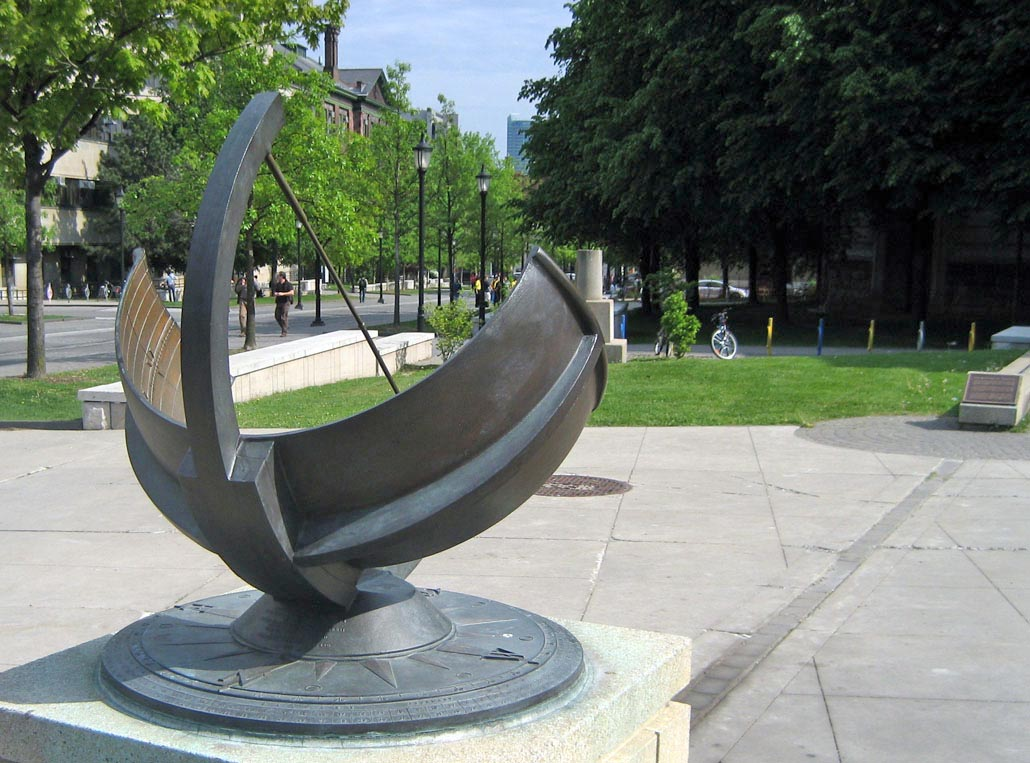
Sundial at the engineering precinct on the St. George campus

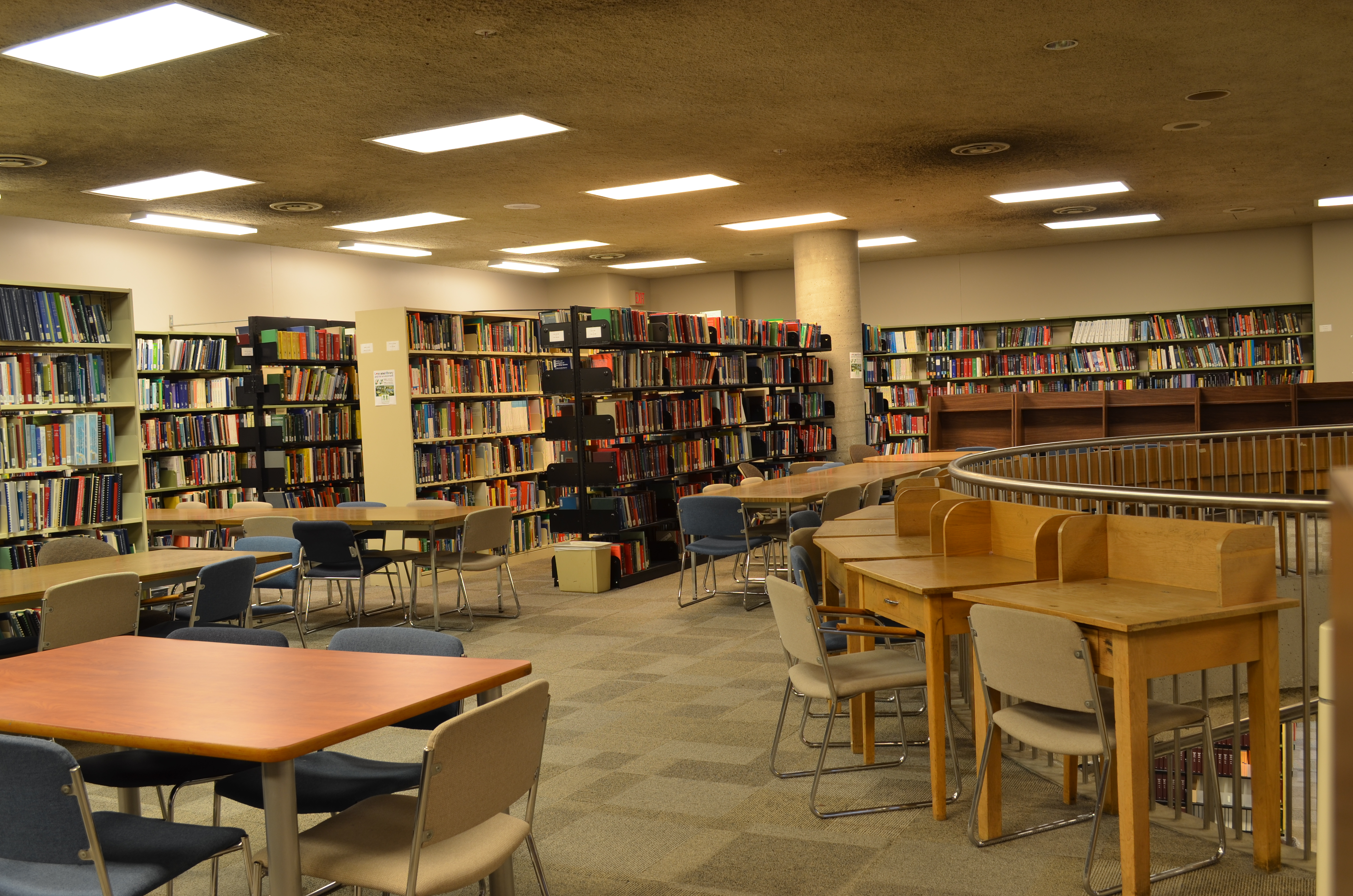
Engineering and Computer Science Library

The Faculty of Applied Science and Engineering offers undergraduate and graduate degrees from the University of Toronto. It is based at and primarily operates on the university's St. George campus, however it also offers select graduate programs on its Mississauga campus. As of the 2022–2023 academic year, there are 5,628 undergraduate students and 3,011 graduate students enrolled in the faculty, and over 50,000 living alumni worldwide.

The undergraduate programs are conducted by the departments of chemical, civil, computer, electrical, industrial, materials, mechanical, and mineral engineering. The faculty awards Bachelor of Applied Science (BASc) degrees for all undergraduate engineering programs, with the exception of the Engineering Science program, in which a Bachelor of Applied Science in Engineering Science is awarded. The faculty also offers graduate degrees. The Master of Engineering (MEng) degree consists of 1 year of full-time study, primarily requiring the completion of coursework and/or a major project. The Master of Applied Science (MASc) degree consists of 2 years of full-time study, and requires the completion of course work and a major thesis. Unlike the MASc, which leads to a PhD degree, the MEng is a terminal degree.

Courses in several majors overlap: the electrical engineering curriculum shares courses with the computer engineering curriculum in the first two years, while chemical engineering shares a set of courses with the environmental engineering option of the civil engineering department. The undergraduate engineering science program consists of courses from a broad range of departments and places greater emphasis on theory than in a traditional engineering curriculum. In the final two years of the program, each student specializes in one of several concentration options, including biomedical engineering, aerospace engineering, and machine learning.

The faculty requires undergraduate students to accumulate 600 hours of engineering work experience, commonly obtained through employment in between academic terms. Students may also choose to participate in a paid internship program called the Professional Experience Year, which involves employment at an engineering company for a period of 12 to 16 months. The Jeffrey Skoll program allows engineering students to earn a bachelor's degree in engineering from the faculty followed by a Master of Business Administration degree from the Rotman School of Management.

Admissions standards are specific to each department, and the faculty had an entry average of 96.0% in 2022. Due to grade inflation, entry averages have been increasing over time.

=== Departments, divisions and specialized institutes ===
The faculty has a number of departments, divisions and extra-departmental units (EDUs) that are split up into different research areas:

==== Divisions ====
- Division of Engineering Science (EngSci)
- Division of Environmental Engineering and Energy Systems (DEEES)

==== Departments ====
- Department of Chemical Engineering and Applied Chemistry (Chem)
- Department of Civil and Mineral Engineering (Civ/Min)
- The Edward S. Rogers Sr. Department of Electrical and Computer Engineering (ECE)
- Department of Materials Science and Engineering (MSE)
- Department of Mechanical and Industrial Engineering (MIE)

==== Extra-departmental units ====
- University of Toronto Institute for Aerospace Studies (UTIAS)
- Institute of Biomedical Engineering (BME)

=== Affiliated research institutes and centres ===
In addition, the faculty works with other research institutes and centres within the nationally and internationally:

- BioZone
- Centre for Advanced Coating Technologies (CACT)
- Centre for Advanced Diffusion-Wave Technologies (CADIFT)
- Centre for Advanced Nanotechnology Centre for Global Engineering (CGEN)
- Centre for Maintenance Optimization and Reliability Engineering (C-MORE)
- Centre for Management of Technology and Entrepreneurship (CMTE)
- Centre for Research in Healthcare Engineering (CRHE)
- Centre for the Resilience of Critical Infrastructure (RCI)
- Centre for Technology and Social Development Emerging Communications Technology Institute (ECTI)
- Identity, Privacy and Security Institute (IPSI)
- Institute for Leadership Education in Engineering (ILead)
- Institute for Multidisciplinary Design and Innovation (UT-IMDI)
- Institute for Optical Sciences Institute for Robotics and Mechatronics (IRM)
- Institute for Sustainable Energy (ISE)
- Intelligent Transportation Systems (ITS) Centre and Test Bed
- Lassonde Institute of Mining
- Pulp and Paper Centre
- Southern Ontario Centre for Atmospheric Aerosol Research (SOCAAR)
- Terrence Donnelly Centre for Cellular and Biomolecular Research
- Ontario Centre for the Characterisation of Advanced Materials (OCCAM)

== Research ==
=== Collaborations with industry ===
On April 7, 2022, the University of Toronto announced a partnership with American biotechnology company Moderna intended to develop new tools to prevent and treat infectious diseases, collaborating with researchers in the fields of molecular genetics, biomedical engineering, and biochemistry. The collaboration is a joint venture across U of T's Faculty of Applied Science and Engineering and Temerty Faculty of Medicine.

== Traditions and student life ==
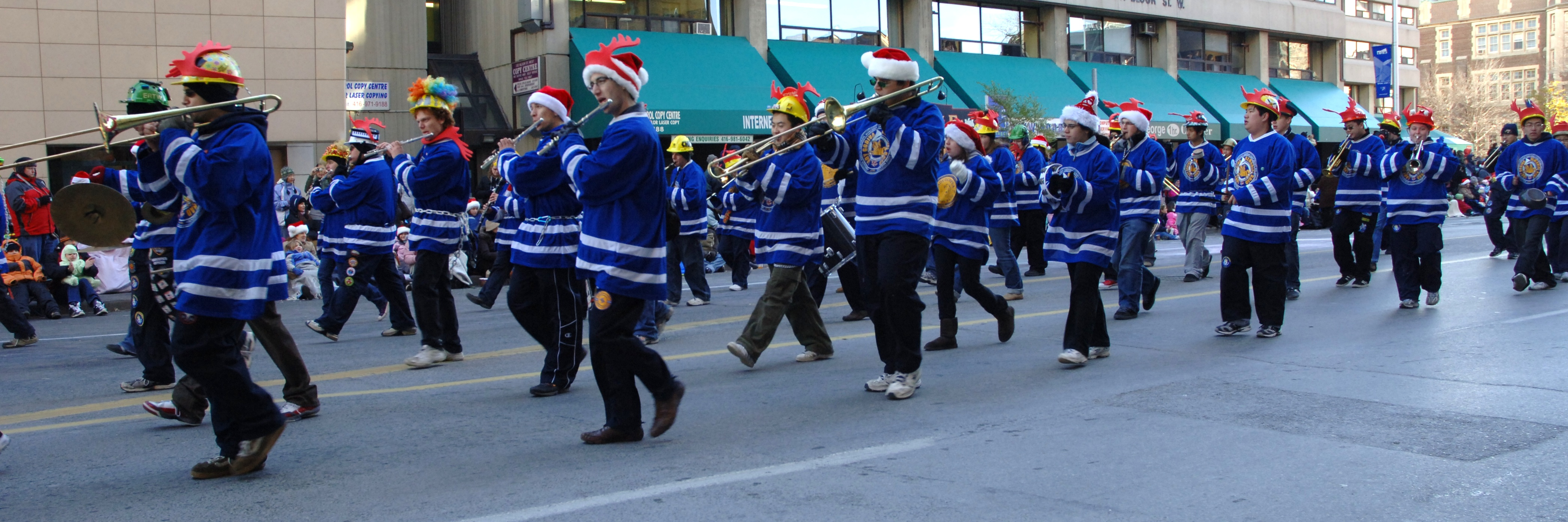
Skule's Lady Godiva Memorial Bnad participates in the Toronto Santa Claus Parade.

Founded in 1885, The University of Toronto Engineering Society is the oldest engineering society in Canada, comprising all undergraduate students in the faculty, and serving as its student government. The Society has been the trademark holder for the Skule nickname since 1984. Usage of the nickname began in the founding years of the School of Practical Science, when students used "skule" as a deliberate misspelling of "school".

The Skule mascot is known as the Ye Olde Mighty Skule Cannon, which began as a cannon stolen from in front of the Parliament Buildings in the fall of 1898, and has since been rebuilt in several incarnations. Students serving as "Cannon Guards" are led by a "Chief Attiliator" to protect the Cannon, which has been historically a target for attempted theft by other engineering schools. The Cannon is often fired (empty-shelled) during orientation events, and can also be heard during various events promoting Skule Spirit.

In September 2021, the University of Toronto Engineering Society, in partnership with the Faculty of Applied Science and Engineering, launched a Skule Mental Health Bursary, to provide access to mental health and wellness support for Engineering undergraduate students who are in need of financial aid.

=== Social events ===
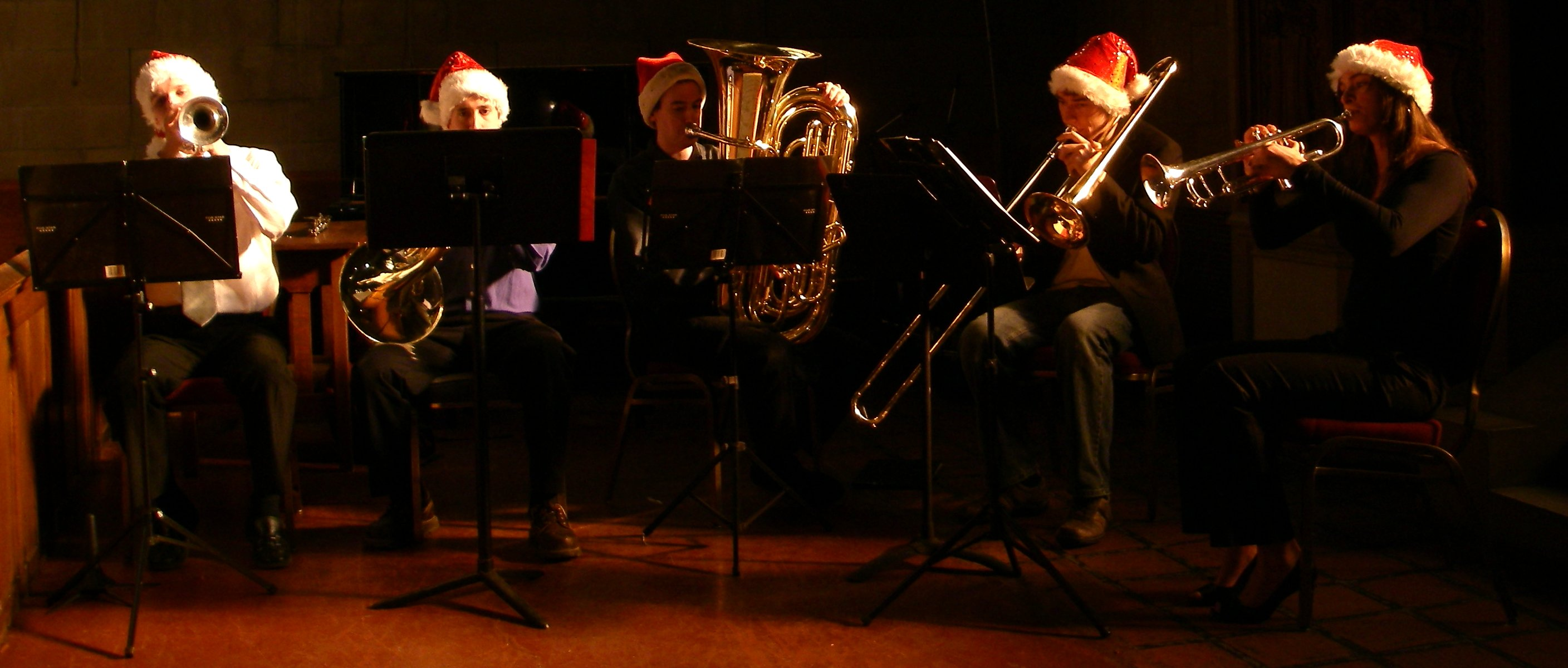
Skule Brass Quintet (also known as the "Brass Ring"), during a concert at Knox College, led by Malcolm McGrath

The Skule Orchestra, founded in 2006, is a full symphonic orchestra of engineering students. It organizes Moment, the Valentine's Ball. Every year the Skule Choir, led by Malcolm McGrath, puts on a Christmas concert, usually located in Knox College Chapel with Malcolm McGrath on the main pipe organ and the Skule Brass Quintet.

The Lady Godiva Memorial Bnad [sic] and "White Noise Brigade" draws its name from the Godiva tradition. Like several other universities, Skule students frequently sing Godiva's Hymn (or the Engineer's Hymn) and revere Lady Godiva. The first week of classes in January following Christmas holidays is designated Godiva Week, and features numerous events, competitions and activities.

The Skule community hosts events, parties, activities, inter-faculty sports, a yearly musical production entitled Skule Nite and special interest lectures throughout the year.

=== Toike Oike ===
The phrase Toike Oike, variously pronounced toy-kee-oyk or toyk-oyk, is derived from an Irish janitor named Graham who was employed in the original School of Practical Science building. When students worked late in the labs and he had to close up the building, he would tell them to "take a hike", which sounded like "toike oike" due to his Irish accent. The phrase is used as the name of the engineering society's humour newspaper, the Toike Oike, in print since 1911. At some points in its publishing history, the humour could be extremely sexual and misogynistic, especially given the predominant male enrollment. One of the more popular editions was a parody of the popular movie Star Wars, rebranded Star Whores. Because of its huge popularity on campuses, copies had to be gotten the day of publication, and would be sold out the next day.

It is also the inspiration for the lyrics of the Skule Yell, the cheer of the engineering society and likely the oldest surviving Skule tradition:

Toike Oike! Toike Oike!
Ollum te Chollum te Chay!
Skule of Science, Skule of Science
Hurray! Hurray! Hurray!
We Are (we are!), We Are (we are!), We Are the Engineers!
We Can (we can!), We Can (we can!), Demolish Forty Beers!
Drink Rum (straight!) Rum (straight!) And Come Along With Us,
For We Don’t Give a Damn For Any Damn Man Who Don’t Give a Damn For Us!
Yaaaay Skule!

The Brute Force Committee: Needs identification of its role in Skule. It was an organization which was part of the trinity of Skule’s cultural leadership, with the cannon and the Bnad. It has never existed, does not exist, and will never exist.

Before the adoption of the Skule Yell, the original cheer was significantly shorter:

Who are we? Can’t you guess?
We are from the S.P.S.
S-C-H-O-O-L!!

Both Skule and the rest of the university recognized the original cheer as inadequate, so the first four lines of the new yell were proposed by A. G. Piper and adopted in 1897. The new yell was first performed that year at Theatre Night, a major campus-wide event for all faculties held on Halloween. The last four lines of the yell are essentially the chorus of Godiva's Hymn, and were first added on November 25, 1905, during the procession from Rosedale Field to the King Edward Hotel following a victory of the Toronto Varsity Blues rugby team over the Ottawa Rough Riders. During the game, Casey Baldwin, a Skuleman, had made a spectacular play in the last minutes to win the dominion championship for the university.

== Notable people ==
=== Alumni ===
- H. E. T. Haultain (class of 1889) – Founder of The Ritual of the Calling of an Engineer
- Frederick Walker Baldwin (class of 1906) – Designer of the Silver Dart, White Wing and Red Wing aircraft
- Karl Brooks Heisey (class of 1922) – Mining engineer and mine president
- Elsie MacGill (class of 1927) – First female aircraft designer, "Queen of the Hurricanes"
- Jim Chamberlin (class of 1936) – Chief designer of the Avro Arrow, chief of engineering for NASA's Project Mercury
- Gerald Bull (class of 1944, M.A.Sc. 1948, Ph.D. 1951) – Ballistics engineer and developer of long-range superguns
- Lewis Urry (class of 1950) – Inventor of the alkaline battery and the lithium battery
- Owen Maynard (class of 1951) – Senior Stress Engineer on the Avro Arrow, Chief of Lunar Excursion Module Engineering, then of Systems Engineering and of Mission Operations in NASA's Project Apollo Program Office
- Alan Milliken Heisey Sr. (class of 1951) – Anti-nationalist, politician and publisher
- Peter Munk (class of 1952) – Founder and chairman of Barrick Gold
- Paul Godfrey (class of 1962) – Politician and former president of the Toronto Blue Jays
- Alfred Aho (class of 1963) – Co-creator of the AWK programming language, co-author of Compilers: Principles, Techniques, and Tools
- Brian Kernighan (class of 1964) – Bell Labs scientist, co-author of The C Programming Language and The UNIX Programming Environment
- Bernard Sherman (class of 1964) – Chairman and CEO of Apotex
- Donald Robert Sadoway (class of 1972, M.A.Sc. 1973, Ph.D. 1977) - Professor Emeritus of materials chemistry at Massachusetts Institute of Technology, notable expert in electrochemistry (molten salt battery and electrolysis)
- Kim Vicente (class of 1985, prof. of industrial engineering 1992–) – Author, The Human Factor
- Jeffrey Skoll (class of 1987) – First employee and president of eBay
- Julie Payette (M.A.Sc. 1990) – Astronaut and Governor General of Canada
- Janet Elliott (B.A.Sc. 1990) -- Engineering scientist and researcher in thermodynamics
- Raffaello D'Andrea (B.A.Sc. 1991) -- engineer, artist, and entrepreneur.
- Nanda Lwin (B.A.Sc. 1993) -- Author, journalist, music historian, engineer, and professor.
- Isabel Bayrakdarian (class of 1997) – Opera singer

== List of deans ==
Below is a list of deans of the faculty.

Deans of the Faculty of Applied Science and Engineering

1. John Galbraith (1889–1914)
2. William Hodgson Ellis (1914–1919)
3. Charles Hamilton Mitchell (1919–1941)
4. Clarence Richard Young (1941–1949)
5. Kenneth Franklin Tupper (1949–1954)
6. Ronald Rusk McLaughlin (1954–1964)
7. James Milton Ham (1964–1973)
8. Bernard Etkin (1973–1979)
9. Gordon Slemon (1979–1986)
10. Gary Heinke (1986–1993)
11. Michael Charles (1993–2001)
12. Anastasios Venetsanopoulos (2001–2006)
13. Cristina Amon (2006–2019)
14. Christopher Yip (2019–present)
