= EIT =

EIT may refer to:

== Education and research institutes ==
- Eastern Institute of Technology, in New Zealand
- Emirates Institute of Technology, now Emirates College of Technology
- Engineering Institute of Technology, in Perth, Australia
- Eritrea Institute of Technology, in Abardae Mai Nefhi, Eritrea
- European Institute of Innovation and Technology, headquartered in Budapest, Hungary

== Science ==
- Electrical impedance tomography
- Electromagnetically induced transparency
- Extended irreversible thermodynamics
- Extreme ultraviolet Imaging Telescope

== Other uses ==
- Eitiep language
- Engineer in Training, professional certification level
- Enhanced interrogation techniques
- Everything Is Terrible!, a video blog
- Economies-in-transition, defined by the Kyoto Protocol
- Event Information Table, television program guide data that accompanies ATSC and DVB broadcasts
