= Jerome C. Hunsaker Visiting Professor of Aerospace Systems =

MIT professorship

The Jerome C. Hunsaker Visiting Professor of Aerospace Systems is a professorship established in 1954 by the Massachusetts Institute of Technology (MIT) Department of Aeronautics and Astronautics. It is named after MIT professor Jerome Hunsaker (1886–1984) in honor of his achievements in aeronautical engineering. The visiting professor is expected to deliver the Minta Martin Lecture in several venues in the United States.

== Visiting professors ==
Academic year	Professor	Lecture
1955–56	William Hawthorne	“The Aerodynamics of Aircraft Engines”
1956–57	I. E. Garrick	“Some Concepts and Problem Areas in Aircraft Flutter”
1957–58	Howard W. Emmons	“Combustion; an Aeronautical Science”
1958–59	George P. Sutton	“Rocket Propulsion Systems for Space Flight”
1959–60	Benjamin S. Kelsey	“Size Considerations in Optimum Aircraft”
1961	W. P. Jones	
1961–62	Samuel Herrick	“Space Navigation”
1963–64	Hans Ziegler	“Thermodynamic Considerations in Continuum Mechanics”
1964–65	Abraham Hyatt	“On Future Scientific and Manned Space Flight Projects”
1965–66	Arthur E. Bryson	“Applications of Optimal Control Theory in Aerospace Engineering”
1968	John C. Evvard	“A Philosophy of Reexamination”
1968–69	Robert W. Seamans	“Action and Reaction”
1969–70	Alfred J. Eggers	
1976–77	Gerard K. O'Neill	
1978–79	Dean R. Chapman	
1979–80	Giuseppe Colombo	
1981	Frank E. Marble	
1989	Joseph F. Shea	
1989–90	Jason L. Speyer	“Guidance, Control and Estimation of Aerospace Systems”
1991–92	Nicholas A. Cumpsty	
1992–93	Duane T. McRuer	“Human Dynamics and Pilot-Induced Oscillations”
1992–93	Stanley I. Weiss	
1994–95	John J. Deyst	“Information Systems in Aerospace Vehicles”
1994–95	Robert R. Lovell	“Issues Affecting the Future of Commercial Space”
1995–96	Terrence A. Weisshaar	
1997–98	Nancy Leveson	
1998–99	Thomas J. Allen	
1999–00	Ann P. Dowling	“Flames, Sound and Vortices—A Damaging Combination”
2000–01	Steven D. Dorfman	
2001–02	Allen C. Haggerty	“Lean Engineering has Finally Come of Age (Or, Why We Can't Ignore 80 Percent of a Product's Cost Anymore)”
2002–03	Kim J. Vicente	
2003–04	Raymond J. Leopold	“The Iridium Story: An Engineer's Eclectic Journey”
2004–05	Patrick M. Cousot	“Abstract Interpretation–based Formal Verification of Complex Computer Systems”
