= McRuer =

McRuer may refer to:

- Donald McRuer (1826–1898), American politician and Congressman
- Robert McRuer (born 1966), American theorist in transnational queer and disability studies
- James Chalmers McRuer (1890–1985), Canadian lawyer, judge, commissioner and author
- Duane McRuer (1925–2007), American engineer
