= Cognitive Work Analysis (book) =

1999 academic textbook

Cognitive Work Analysis : towards safe, productive, and healthy computer-based work
- Author: Kim J. Vicente
- Cover artist: Kathryn Houghtaling
- Language: English
- Subject: Human-computer interaction, Work environment, Industrial safety
- Genre: Non-fiction: Academic: Textbook
- Publisher: Lawrence Erlbaum Associates, Inc.
- Publication date: 1999
- Publication place: Mahwah, NJ, USA
- Media type: Print
- Pages: 392
- ISBN: 0-8058-2397-2
- Website: Cognitive Work Analysis | Toward Safe, Productive, and Healthy Computer-Based Work

Cognitive Work Analysis : towards safe, productive, and healthy computer-based work is an academic textbook by Kim Vicente that Lawrence Erlbaum Associates, Inc. published in 1999.

== Contents ==
=== Part One - Introduction ===
In part one, Vicente provides the background, motivations and definitions for cognitive work analysis.

=== Part Two - Three Approaches to Work Analysis ===
In part two, Vicente outlines three approaches to work analysis: normative, descriptive and formative.

=== Part Three - Cognitive Work Analysis in Action ===
In part three, Vicente gives a process control case study and outlines the five phases of analysis: work domain, control task, strategies, social organization, and worker competencies.

=== Part Four - Final Words ===
In the final chapter in part four, Vicente summarizes cognitive work analysis and the importance and implications for using it in the global knowledge-based economy. He argues the benefits for safety, productivity, and health.

== Reception ==
In Tim Ferris' review, he praises the extensive references and the engineering approach to usability and user interface. Both Tim and Gerard Tornvliet's reviews, criticize the lack of practical "how to" content to perform the relevant work analysis, or any related computer-based tools.
