= Cristina Amon =

Venezuelan American mechanical engineer and academic administrator

Cristina H. Amon
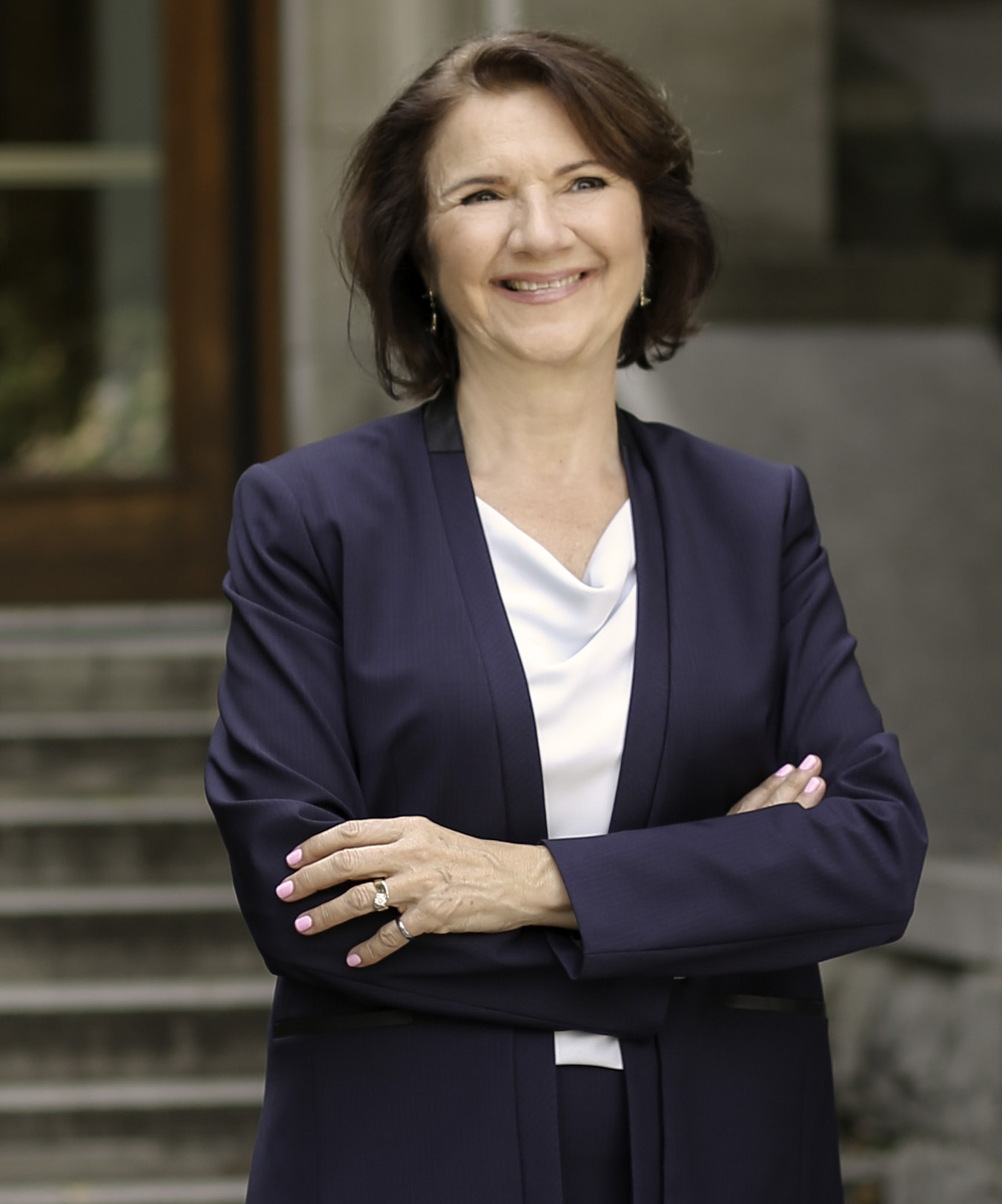
- Cristina Amon in 2015

Dean of the University of Toronto Faculty of Applied Science and Engineering
- In office 2006–2019
- Preceded by: Anastasios Venetsanopoulos
- Succeeded by: Christopher Yip

Personal details
- Born: Montevideo, Uruguay
- Awards: Engineers Canada The Gold Medal Award (2020); EIC Sir John Kennedy Medal (2017); ASME Honorary Member (2016); ASME Heat Transfer 75th Anniversary Medal (2013); RSC Elected Fellow (2011); NAE Elected Member (2006); ASEE George Westinghouse Award (1997)

Academic background
- Education: Massachusetts Institute of Technology (MSc and ScD, 1998) Simón Bolívar University (1981)
- Alma mater: Massachusetts Institute of Technology
- Thesis: "Heat Transfer Enhancement and Three-Dimensional Transitional Flows by a Spectral Element-Fourier Method" (1988)

Academic work
- Discipline: Mechanical engineering
- Sub-discipline: Fluid dynamics Heat transfer
- Institutions: University of Toronto (2006-present); Carnegie Mellon University (1988-2006)

Cristina H. Amon CM is a mechanical engineer, academic administrator and was the 13th dean of the University of Toronto Faculty of Applied Science and Engineering. She was the Faculty's first female dean. Prior to her appointment at the University of Toronto in 2006, she was the Raymond J. Lane Distinguished Professor and director of the Institute for Complex Engineered Systems at Carnegie Mellon University.

== Education ==
Amon graduated with a degree in mechanical engineering from Venezuela's Simón Bolívar University in 1981. She went on to graduate studies at the Massachusetts Institute of Technology, completing a Master of Science (MSc) in 1985 and a doctor of science (ScD) in 1988.

== Research ==
Amon is a pioneer in the development of computational fluid dynamics (CFD) for thermal design solutions in systems with multidisciplinary competing constraints. She has made contributions to concurrent thermal designs, electronics cooling and transient thermal management of wearable computers and electric vehicles.

Amon leads the University of Toronto's Advanced Thermal/Fluids Optimization, Modelling, and Simulation (ATOMS) Laboratory where she conducts research in nanoscale thermal transport phenomena in semiconductors, energy systems and bioengineered devices. Amon's academic contributions include a number of highly cited book chapters and articles leading to an h-index of over 51.

== Career ==
Amon became an assistant professor in mechanical engineering at Carnegie Mellon University in 1988, and was promoted to associate professor in 1993 and full professor in 1997. In 1998, she was named the Associate Director of the Institute for Complex Engineered Systems, and became its Director in 1999. She became the Raymond J. Lane Distinguished Professor of Mechanical Engineering in 2001.

Her appointment as Dean of the Faculty of Applied Science and Engineering at the University of Toronto began in 2006. She was appointed as Alumni Chair Professor in BioEngineering in the Department of Mechanical and Industrial Engineering at the same time. Amon is the Faculty's first female dean.

Amon is committed to increasing diversity within the engineering profession. In 2017, she was selected as the opening speaker at the Women in Science and Engineering 2017 National Conference. Under Amon's leadership, female enrolment in the first-year cohort at U of T Engineering reached a record 40.1% in 2016.

Amon was also instrumental in bringing the Centre for Engineering Innovation & Entrepreneurship (CEIE) to life. The building will be the future hub of the Faculty's collaborative learning and interdisciplinary research. Construction began in 2015.

== Honors and awards ==
Amon holds a number of honours and awards.

- Life fellow of the American Association for the Advancement of Science and American Society of Mechanical Engineers (ASME).
- Fellow of the Canadian Society for Mechanical Engineering, American Society for Engineering Education (ASEE), Institute of Electrical and Electronics Engineers, and Canadian Academy of Engineering.
- She received several awards from the ASEE, including the prestigious 1997 George Westinghouse and 2002 Ralph Coats Roe Awards.
- In 2003, she received the Hispanic Engineer National Achievement Education Award.
- In 2005, she was named one of America's most important Hispanics in technology and business.
- In 2006, she was elected as a member into the National Academy of Engineering.
- In 2011 she was awarded the SWE Achievement Award by the Society of Women Engineers.
- In 2015, Amon received the Ontario Professional Engineers Gold Medal from Professional Engineers Ontario and the Ontario Society of Professional Engineers.
- In 2017, she received the Engineering Institute of Canada's Sir John Kennedy Medal.
- In Amon received the 2020 Engineers Canada Gold Medal Award.
- Her editorship roles include the ASME Journal of Heat Transfer, IEEE Transactions on Components and Packaging Technology, and Frontiers in Heat and Mass Transfer.
- Amon is featured in the Notable Women in Computing cards.
