= Lady Godiva Memorial Bnad =

Canadian musical group

- Nickname: Marching Gregorian Chant Society; White Noise Brigade; Skule Band
- School: University of Toronto Faculty of Applied Science and Engineering
- Location: Toronto, Ontario, Canada
- Founded: 1949
- Members: 20-50
- Website: lgmb.skule.ca

The Lady Godiva Memorial Bnad [sic] (LGMB) is a student-run scramble band within the University of Toronto Engineering Society. The band is notable for its open membership policy and sometimes audacious and surprise appearances at events, venues and university lectures.

Originally named the Lady Godiva Memorial Band, the group has been renamed since its founding to the Lady Godiva Memorial Bnad, with the title "Bnad" purposely misspelled.

While the band has traditional marching band instrumentation, members can also be seen with objects such as stop signs, fire bells, jugs, and frying pans.

Similar bands exist in engineering faculties at the University of Manitoba (Engineering Symonized Marching Band [sic]) and the University of British Columbia (Godiva Band).

Some notable past members of the LGMB include Don Monro (1961–1966) and Bob Bossin (1966–1969).

== History ==
=== Founding ===
The Lady Godiva Memorial Band was founded in 1949, by A.J. Paul La Prairie while he was a student at the University of Toronto Faculty of Applied Science and Engineering. Originally called The Lady Godiva Band, it was soon renamed to the Lady Godiva Memorial Band, and then Lady Godiva Memorial Bnad years later.

In 1949, the group had around fifteen members and was initially led by their founder A.J. Paul La Prairie. During their second rehearsal, however, it was discovered that La Prairie could not read music, so the band was turned over to Tom Kenney, a chemical engineering student.

The first uniform consisted of a few red military jackets and pith helmets. The uniform along with their first bass drum, two tenor drums, cymbals and a drum major's baton were courtesy of La Prairie's resourcefulness and his military connections. Members who did not wear military jackets were often seen in the traditional leather jacket of the engineering faculty. Later, members began to wear their decorated hardhats to events.

The first public appearance of the band was in October 1949 at the annual University of Toronto homecoming parade on the back of a flatbed truck.

=== 1960s and 1970s ===
The band notably attended a prank set at the opening of the Bloor-Danforth subway on February 26, 1966. During this time around 500 University of Toronto students fled into the station by jumping over the turnstiles, including LGMB members. 400 members boarded the subway train, while some of the remaining students pulled the emergency power switch which interfered with regular service for more than five hours.

In the 1970s, at the beginning of University of Toronto St. George Frosh Week each year, the LGMB met on the provincial lawn in front of the Ontario provincial legislature. There with engineering, law, medical and arts first year students they received a speech from the presiding Ontario Premier. During the ceremony the band played several "standard" selections as well as Godiva's Hymn. The band always sought creative opportunities to contribute to the city's culture including serenading patrons at the St. Charles Tavern, a known gay bar, at their annual Halloween Drag event to the delight of onlookers.

During February 1972, the band played uninvited at an important hockey game where the University of Toronto Varsity Blues played the USSR student national hockey team.

In the fall of 1976 the LGMB played at the CN Tower alongside Pierre Trudeau and his wife Margaret, becoming the first band to play at the CN Tower.

In 1977, band members began to wear a new uniform. Along with leather jackets and decorated hardhats, members also wore hockey shirts adorned with the LGMB logo on the front. To reflect the colours of the Skule, the shirts were originally mostly yellow with blue and white accents. This design was updated to mostly blue with yellow and white accents in 1993.

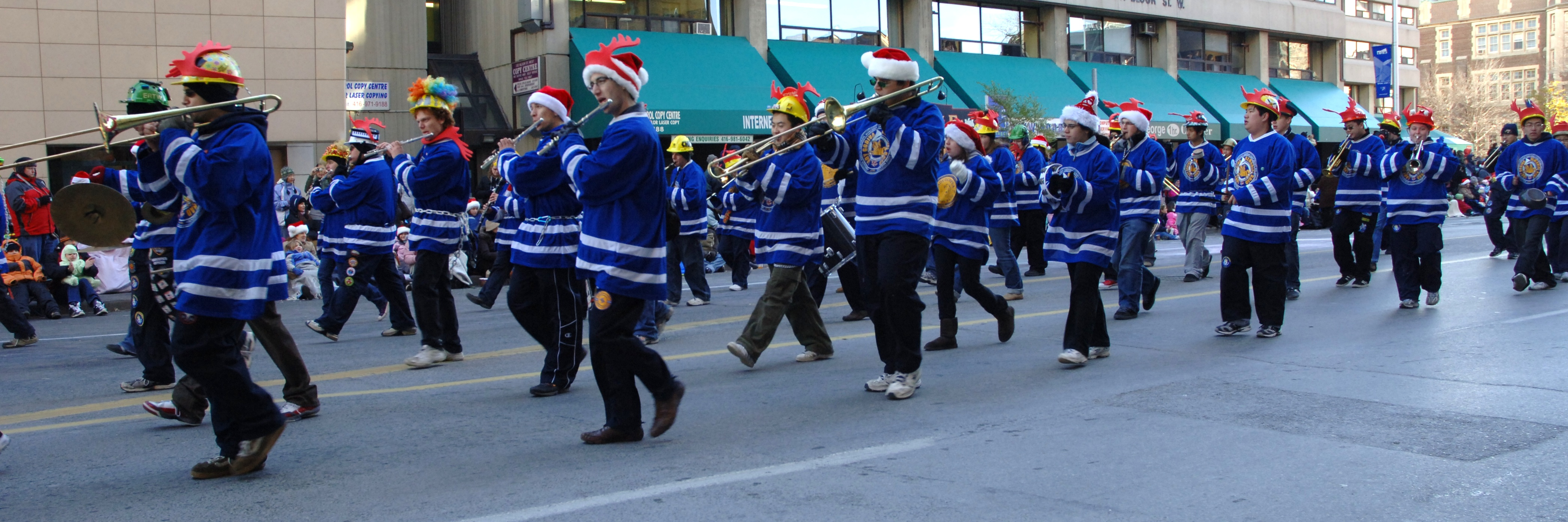
The band participating in the 2007 Toronto Santa Claus parade.

=== Later years ===
In 2000, the LGMB sat in the audience for a showing of Jonovision. They were mentioned briefly by the host Jonathan Torrens. The LGMB also made it onto Breakfast Television on September 3, 2002.

In 2002, the band continued its tradition of attending "openings" by riding on the opening subway of the Sheppard subway line.

The band participated in the 2007 Toronto Santa Claus Parade for the first time officially. This came after years of crashing the parade uninvited, which often resulting in band members being escorted away by the Toronto Police Service. The LGMB has been invited back to the Santa Claus Parade every year since.

== Performance style ==
The band is formed as a scramble band and does not formally march to set cadences. The group gathers as a loose formation. While on parade or at an event, the choice of pieces is typically spontaneous. The director, known as the Bnad Leedur [sic], will informally start playing the song on their own instrument, with the rest of the group joining in afterwards.

Certain events such as the Toronto Santa Claus Parade, require the band to refrain from parody songs with lyrics that are considered unsuitable for younger children.

Although the structure is loose on song selection, traditional and frequent locations or events have set songs. For example, the "Walking Song" is played when the band walks, "Wipe Out" is played when the band returns to the instrument storage room through the archway on the west side of Hart House, and "Godiva's Hymn" is played in the presence of the Skule's mascot, Ye Olde Mighty Skule Cannon.

=== Repertoire ===
The band plays an assortment of musical cheers, parody songs, drinking songs and Christmas songs. Parody songs such as "Game Take Me Out" and "Four Skin" have been written to the tunes of Take Me Out to the Ball Game and My Bonnie Lies Over the Ocean, respectively.

Traditional marching songs such as Washington and Lee Swing and the University of Toronto's fight song, The Blue and White are also included in the band's main repertoire.

One staple of the band's repertoire is Godiva's Hymn and it is often played with lyrics sung by accompanying band members.

=== Instrumentation ===
During an event, band members play an instrument of their choice including traditional marching band instruments such as brass and woodwind instruments. As well, the group also includes non-traditional marching band instruments such as electric guitar (with portable amplifier), electric keyboard, melodica, and kazoo.

Members are also allowed to perform on any other non-musical instruments such as a stop sign, wet floor sign, kettle, frying pan, and picket sign. These primarily hit with sticks, much like a percussion instrument.

Although not constrained, the band leader typically plays the trumpet or trombone for its simplicity, range, and volume. The drum major, known in the band as the D(r)umb Majur(k) [sic] plays the snare drum without exception, but may improvise by tapping on any other instrument, object, or person as a drum during certain pieces.

== Albums and discography ==
The band has released eight albums: Lady Godiva Memorial Band at the Mighty Cannonball (1962), The Lady Godiva Memorial Band Strikes Back!! (1964), Lady Godiva Memorial Band Blows (1967), Band With the Runs (1977), Never Mind the Football Game, Here's the Lady Godiva Memorial Band (1989), Let Go Me Bongos! (1999), Let's Get More Beer! (2017), and Never Mind Skule 150, Here's the Lady Godiva Memorial Bnad (2023).

== Awards ==
- 1st Place - 1964 Kiwanis Music Festival, Brass and Reed Bands
- 1st Place - 1967 Kiwanis Music Festival
- 2nd Place - 1976 Kiwanis Music Festival, Brass and Reed Bands (Class 425)
- 1st Place - 1980 Kiwanis Music Festival, Brass and Reed Bands — membership to be less than 30 (Class 501)
