= Anastasios Venetsanopoulos =

Canadian engineer (1941–2014)

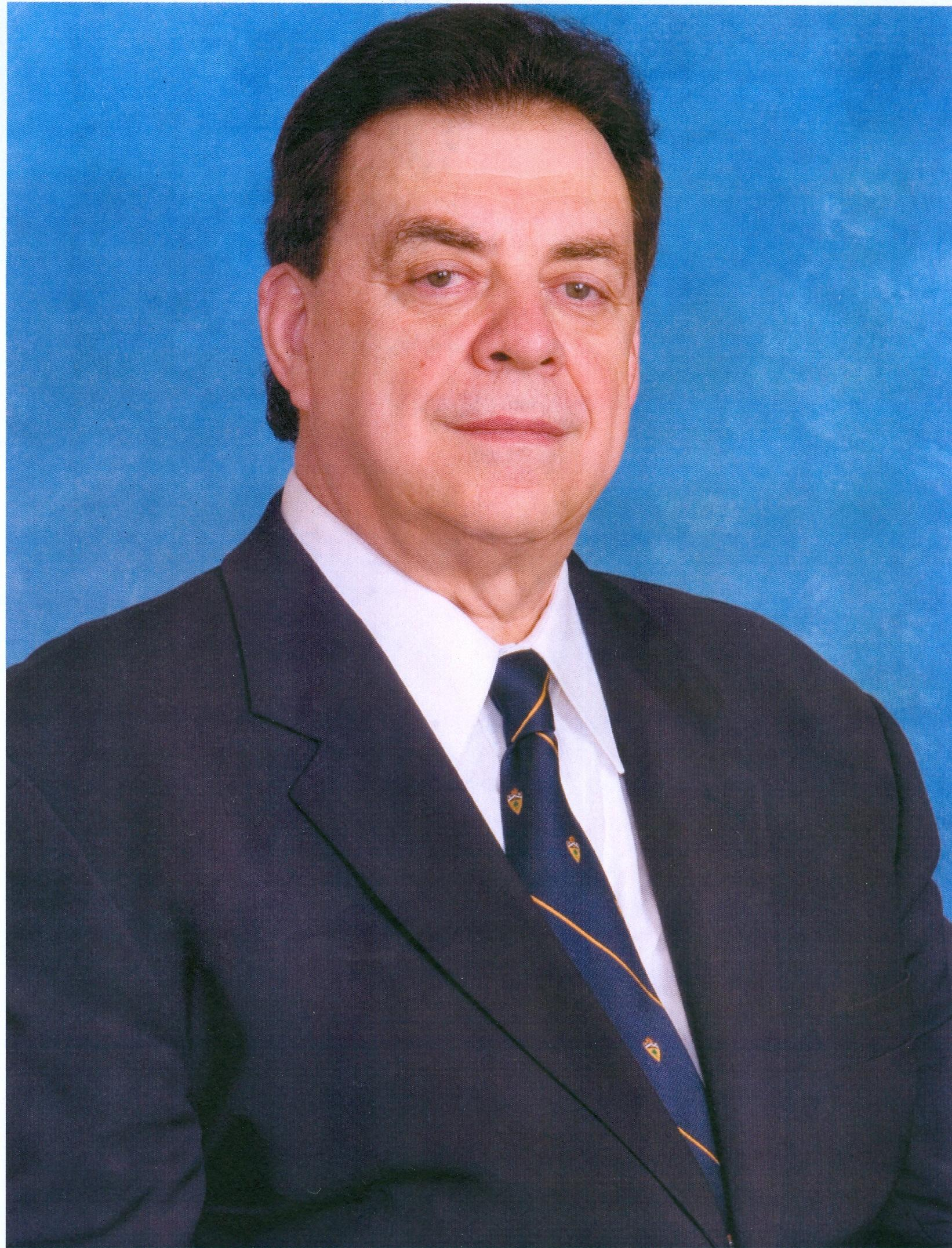

Dean of the University of Toronto Faculty of Applied Science and Engineering
- In office 2001–2006
- Preceded by: Michael Charles
- Succeeded by: Cristina Amon

Personal details
- Born: June 19, 1941 (age 85)
- Died: November 17, 2014 (aged 73)
- Education: National Technical University of Athens; Yale University
- Scientific career
- Fields: Electrical and Computer Engineering
- Workplaces: Toronto Metropolitan University; University of Toronto
- Doctoral advisor: F.B. Tuteur

Anastasios (Tas) Venetsanopoulos (June 19, 1941 – November 17, 2014) was a professor of electrical and computer engineering at Toronto Metropolitan University (formerly Ryerson University) in Toronto, Ontario and a professor emeritus with the Edward S. Rogers Department of Electrical and Computer Engineering at the University of Toronto. In October 2006, Venetsanopoulos joined what was then Ryerson University (now Toronto Metropolitan University) and served as the founding vice-president of research and innovation. His portfolio included oversight of the university's international activities, research ethics, Office of Research Services, and Office of Innovation and Commercialization. He retired from that position in 2010, but remained a distinguished advisor to the role. Tas Venetsanopoulos continued to actively supervise his research group at the University of Toronto, and was a highly sought-after consultant throughout his career.

== Education ==
Venetsanopoulos received a Bachelor of Electrical and Mechanical Engineering degree from the National Technical University of Athens, and an M.S., M.Phil., and a PhD in electrical engineering from Yale University, New Haven, Connecticut. Tas Venetsanopoulos was a Fulbright Scholar and a Schmitt Scholar, and in 1994 was awarded an honorary doctorate from his alma mater, the National Technical University of Athens.

== Personal life ==
In 1986, Venetsanopoulos married Vasiliki Koronakis in a Greek Orthodox service in Toronto, Ontario. They have two daughters: Elizabeth Venetsanopoulos (born 1987) and Dominique Venetsanopoulos (born 1988).

== Research interests ==
Venetsanopoulos' research interests included: biometrics research; multimedia (image compression, image and video retrieval); digital signal/image processing (multichannel image processing, nonlinear, adaptive and M-D filtering, knowledge-based image processing and recognition, 3-D imaging, biomedical applications); pattern classification and telecommunications.

== Research record ==
Venetsanopoulos had a long career in research, education and university administration. He was an internationally researcher in the fields of multimedia systems, digital signal and image processing, digital communications, biometrics and neural networks. Over a period of four decades, he established himself in the worldwide telecommunications and signal processing community as a researcher, scholar, professor and consultant. He made contributions to telecommunications, signal and image processing, multimedia and biometrics research by authoring and co-authoring many journal papers and books. His pioneering and fundamental research contributions, along with the writing of numerous graduate-level books, opened up new vistas in several fields, including telecommunications; multidimensional filter theory and design; the design of non-linear filters; multimedia neural networks; biometrics applications and WLAN positioning systems.

According to a 2020 Google Scholar count, his work has been cited in over 22,600 research papers and 400 textbooks. He was a mentor for over 160 graduate students and post-doctoral fellows.

Telecommunications

Professor Venetsanopoulos' early work dealt with the problem of optimal detection and signal design, to facilitate communication over purely random, general, linear, time-varying, very noisy, undersea acoustic channels. His results contributed to the improvement of SONAR systems for undersea communications over fading dispersive channels and was later applied to ionospheric and tropospheric channels.

Subsequent publications focused on the issue of image and video compression and made contributions in the area of progressive image transmission (PIT). PIT refers to the coding of still images at increasing levels of precision. Through PIT, it is possible to expedite activities such as browsing through remote databases of images. Professor Venetsanopoulos developed and tested a number of first and second generation morphological pyramidal techniques, which achieved compression ratios of around 100:1 for good quality, lossy, still image transmission. He contributed to the study of vector quantization for lossy image compression and developed a number of hierarchical coding techniques for still images. Wavelet techniques for still image compression were also addressed by him, as well as fractal-based techniques for compressing and coding still images and video sequences. His later contributions in telecommunications were in the area of mobility management and he developed cost-effective algorithms for mobile terminal location and determination and WLAN positioning systems. This area has attracted interest for its applications in emergency communications, location-sensitive browsing, and resource allocation.

Signal and image processing

Professor Venetsanopoulos was one of the first Canadian researchers to make a contribution to the foundations of two-dimensional and multi-dimensional digital filtering. These techniques are widely used in image and video processing. His early contributions in these areas provided the basis for a variety of techniques that led to efficient two-dimensional filter design. In the eighties, his interest was focused on the area of nonlinear filters. Nonlinear filters are more complex than linear filters but allow additional flexibility and speed in complex applications.

In the area of nonlinear filters, Professor Venetsanopoulos contributed theoretical results, including the introduction of new filter families. The "Nonlinear Order Statistics Filters" were a special case of linear median, order statistics, homomorphic, a-trimmed median, generalized mean, nonlinear mean and fuzzy nonlinear filters. New versions of polynomial filters, such as quadratic filters, were also studied by Professor Venetsanopoulos. He designed new morphological filters, which lead to various detection and recognition applications.

Finally, he conducted extensive research in the area of Adaptive filters. Professor Venetsanopoulos developed Adaptive Order Statistics filters, Adaptive LMS/RLS filters, Adaptive L-filters and Adaptive morphological filter algorithms. These filters are extensively used in numerous biomedical applications, such as in radiology, mammography and tomography. Among other applications, they are also applied to financial data processing and remote sensing. In the nineties, Professor Venetsanopoulos contributed to the field of color image processing and analysis, where he introduced a number of techniques for color image enhancement filtering and analysis. He also introduced the so-called vector directional filter family, which operates along the direction of the color vectors. A new class of adaptive nonlinear filters was developed. Fuzzy membership functions based on different distance measures were adopted to determine the weights of new nonlinear, adaptive filters. The new filters encompassed different classes of existing nonlinear filters as special cases. For the first time, the color image was treated as a vector field and edge information carried directly by the color vectors was exploited using vector order statistics.

Multimedia signal processing

In 1999 Professor Venetsanopoulos became the Inaugural Chair of the Bell Canada Multimedia Systems Laboratory at the University of Toronto. From that year, he contributed to the area of multimedia data mining and information retrieval by addressing two key technical challenges: a) the problem of similarity determination within the visual data domain, b) the interactive learning of user intentions and automatic adjustment of system parameters for improved retrieval accuracy. He developed still image and video retrieval systems that utilized color content queries. The system implemented a new vector-based approach to image retrieval using an angular-based similarity measure. The scheme he developed addresses the drawbacks of the histogram techniques, it is flexible, and outperforms established retrieval systems. He also developed an interactive learning algorithm for resolving ambiguities arising due to the mismatch between machine-representation of images and human context-dependent interpretation of visual content. His proposed solution exploited feedback from users during retrieval sessions, to adapt their query intentions and improve the accuracy of the retrieved results.

Biometrics research

For thousands of years, humans have used visually-perceived body characteristics such as face and gait to recognize one another. This remarkable ability of human visual system led Professor Venetsanopoulos to build automated systems to recognize individuals from digitally captured facial images and gait sequences. Face and gait recognition belong to the field of biometrics, a very active area of research in computer science, mainly motivated by government and security-related considerations. Face and gait are two typical physiological and behavioral biometrics. Venetsanopoulos contributed to both areas and his research has been extensively cited. There are two general approaches to the subject: the appearance-based approach and the model-based approach. Appearance-based face recognition processes a 2-D facial image as 2-D holistic patterns. The whole face region is the raw input to a recognition system and each face image is commonly represented by a high-dimensional vector consisting of the pixel intensity values in the image. Thus, face recognition is transformed to a multivariate, statistical pattern recognition problem. In a similar fashion to appearance-based face recognition, an appearance-based gait recognition approach considers gait as a holistic pattern and uses a full-body representation of a human subject as silhouettes or contours. Gait video sequences are naturally three-dimensional objects, formally named tensor objects, and they are very difficult to deal with using traditional vector-based learning algorithms. In order to deal with these tensor objects effectively, Venetsanopoulos and his research team developed a framework of multilinear subspace learning, so that computation and memory demands are reduced, natural structure and correlation in the original data are preserved, and more compact and useful features can be obtained. The Model-based gait recognition approach considers a human subject as an articulated object, represented by various body poses. Professor Venetsanopoulos proposed a full-body, layered deformable model (LDM) inspired by the manually labeled body-part-level silhouettes. The LDM has a layered structure to model self-occlusion between body parts and it is deformable, so simple limb deformation is taken into consideration. In addition, it also models shoulder swing. The LDM parameters can be recovered from automatically extracted silhouettes and then used for recognition.

== Publications and grants ==
Venetsanopoulos authored or co-authored nine books; contributed chapters to 35 books; and published over 870 academic papers in refereed journals and conference proceedings. Venetsanopoulos' best known contributions to electrical engineering are: "Nonlinear Digital Filters: Principles and Applications", "Artificial Neural Networks: Learning Algorithms, Performance Evaluation, and Applications", "Color Image Processing and Applications", "WLAN Positioning Systems", "Multilinear Subspace Learning: Dimensionality Reduction of Multidimensional Data".

He was supported by grants from the Natural Sciences and Engineering Research Council of Canada (NSERC); the Centers of Excellence of the province of Ontario; the Ontario Research Fund; the Canadian Space Agency; Spar Aerospace; Ontario Hydro; the Department of Fisheries and Oceans, Canada; the Department of Communications, Canada; and the province of Ontario.

== Career ==
Venetsanopoulos joined the department of electrical and computer engineering (ECE) at the University of Toronto in September 1968 as a lecturer. He was promoted to assistant professor in 1970, associate professor in 1973, and professor in 1981. Venetsanopoulos served as chair of the communications group and associate chair of the department of electrical engineering. Between July 1997 and June 2001, he was associate chair of the graduate studies of the department of electrical and computer engineering and was acting chair during the spring term of 1998–99. In 1999, a chair in multimedia was established in the ECE Department, made possible by a donation of $1.25 million from Bell Canada, matched with $1 million of university funds. Venetsanopoulos served as inaugural chairholder between 1999 and 2005 and two assistant professors were hired in the same field. During the period 2001–2006, he served as the twelfth dean of the faculty of applied science and engineering at the University of Toronto.

Venetsanopoulos' five-year term as the twelfth dean of the University of Toronto Applied Science and Engineering –the largest and most prominent faculty of engineering in Canada– was characterized by an ambitious record of achievement. During his tenure, the "Great Minds" campaign of the Faculty raised $124 Million in external donations, matched by an equal amount of funds from granting agencies and foundations. There were two major buildings constructed: the Bahen Centre for Information Technology with the faculty of arts and sciences, and the Terrence Donnelly Centre for Cellular and Biomolecular Research with the faculty of medicine. A strategic plan for 2004-2010 set the direction for faculty-wide revitalization. The undergraduate curriculum was revised to offer greater flexibility and enrichment. The office of the vice-dean, research and graduate studies was introduced to enhance the research of the faculty. An exceptional number of citations of professors of the faculty resulted, while streamlining of administrative units across the faculty. The faculty of engineering increased its focus on teaching and on the quality of the student experience. There was greater multi-disciplinary collaboration.

Venetsanopoulos went on research leave at the Imperial College of Science and Technology, the National Technical University of Athens, the Swiss Federal Institute of Technology, the University of Florence, the Federal University of Rio de Janeiro and the University of Grenoble, France. He also served as adjunct professor at Concordia University. During 2003-06 he served as a member of the advisory board of the faculty of engineering of the National University of Singapore. In April 2009, he was appointed as the distinguished guest professor of the Communications University of China. He served as lecturer in 138 short courses to industry and continuing education programs and as consultant to numerous organizations.

On 1 October 2006, Venetsanopoulos joined Ryerson University as the founding vice-president of research and innovation. In that position, Venetsanopoulos accepted oversight of Ryerson's international activities, research ethics and the office of research services and the office of innovation and commercialization. In this role, he implemented four strategies to transform the Ryerson University, which was a polytechnic institution only a few years before. First, the provision of stimulus and support to the quality and quantity of scholarly research and creative activity (with the stated goal of delivering a research enterprise of over $20 Million by the 2010-11 fiscal year). Second, the facilitation of the transfer of new knowledge to the community, industry and the marketplace. Third, the pursuit of partnerships and collaborations that supported the overall scholarly research and creative activities plan. Fourth, the provision of research opportunities to both undergraduate and graduate students throughout the university. Under his leadership, the research trajectory at Ryerson included international competitions for outstanding postdoctoral fellows; a focus on increasing innovation; international and commercial activity; and university support for excellence and ingenuity among graduate and undergraduate students.

On 30 June 2010, Venetsanopoulos retired from the position of vice-president research and innovation at Ryerson and took a one-year administrative leave and subsequently joined the department of electrical and computer engineering. In the words of Ryerson's President Sheldon Levy, "As the first ever Vice-President, Research and Innovation at Ryerson, Tas brought to the position an immediate credibility and presence based on his own international research record. He advanced research in ways that established the university as active and competitive in Scholarly Research and Creative Activity. Under his leadership Ryerson has attracted scholars and postdoctoral fellows with unprecedented momentum, and made great progress in visibility, perception and objective rankings related to research... Externally funded research has more than doubled in the past four years, and Ryerson now ranks in the top half of non-medical universities in Canada for research... Under Tas' leadership the research trajectory at Ryerson has been one of extraordinary growth and success." In December 2011, Venetsanopoulos was appointed, "Distinguished Advisor to the Vice President Research and Innovation" and continued his full-time academic duties as a professor of electrical and computer engineering at Ryerson University until his death.

== Professional service and awards ==
Venetsanopoulos served as chairperson on numerous boards, councils and technical conference committees of the Institute of Electrical and Electronics Engineers (IEEE). He served as the chair of the Toronto Section from 1977 to 1979 and the IEEE Central Canada Council from 1980 to 1982. He was president of the Canadian Society for Electrical Engineering and vice president of the Engineering Institute of Canada from 1983 to 1986. He was a guest editor or associate editor for several IEEE journals and the editor of the Canadian Electrical Engineering Journal (1981–1983). He was a member of the Communications, Circuits and Systems, Computer, and Signal Processing Societies of IEEE, as well as a member of Sigma Xi, the Association for Computing Machinery, the American Society for Engineering Education, the Technical Chamber of Greece, and the Association of Professional Engineers of Ontario (APEO) and Greece.

In 1994, Venetsanopoulos was awarded an honorary doctorate from the National University of Technology in Athens, Greece. In 1996, he was awarded the "Excellence in Innovation" Award from the Information Technology Research Centre of Ontario and the Royal Bank of Canada for his work in image processing. Venetsanopoulos was also awarded the "Millennium Medal of IEEE", and the "MacNaughton Medal". In March 2006, he was a joint recipient of the IEEE Transactions on Neural Networks Outstanding Paper Award. He was a Fellow of the Engineering Institute of Canada, the IEEE for contribution to digital signal and image processing, and the Canadian Academy of Engineering. In 2008, A.N. Venetsanopoulos along with Rastislav Lukac, Bogdan Smolka and Konstantinos N. Plataniotis were awarded the "Most Cited Paper Award" by the Journal of Visual Communication and Image Representation for their work in artificial neural networks. In 2010, Venetsanopoulos was elected as Fellow of the Royal Society of Canada.
