= Extremal principles in non-equilibrium thermodynamics =

Energy dissipation and entropy production extremal principles are ideas developed within non-equilibrium thermodynamics that attempt to predict the likely steady states and dynamical structures that a physical system might show. The search for extremum principles for non-equilibrium thermodynamics follows their successful use in other branches of physics. According to Kondepudi (2008), and to Grandy (2008), there is no general rule that provides an extremum principle that governs the evolution of a far-from-equilibrium system to a steady state. According to Glansdorff and Prigogine (1971, page 16), irreversible processes usually are not governed by global extremal principles because description of their evolution requires differential equations which are not self-adjoint, but local extremal principles can be used for local solutions. Lebon Jou and Casas-Vásquez (2008) state that "In non-equilibrium ... it is generally not possible to construct thermodynamic potentials depending on the whole set of variables". Šilhavý (1997) offers the opinion that "... the extremum principles of thermodynamics ... do not have any counterpart for [non-equilibrium] steady states (despite many claims in the literature)." It follows that any general extremal principle for a non-equilibrium problem will need to refer in some detail to the constraints that are specific for the structure of the system considered in the problem.

== Fluctuations, entropy, 'thermodynamics forces', and reproducible dynamical structure ==
Apparent 'fluctuations', which appear to arise when initial conditions are inexactly specified, are the drivers of the formation of non-equilibrium dynamical structures. There is no special force of nature involved in the generation of such fluctuations. Exact specification of initial conditions would require statements of the positions and velocities of all particles in the system, obviously not a remotely practical possibility for a macroscopic system. This is the nature of thermodynamic fluctuations. They cannot be predicted in particular by the scientist, but they are determined by the laws of nature and they are the singular causes of the natural development of dynamical structure.

It is pointed out by W.T. Grandy Jr that entropy, though it may be defined for a non-equilibrium system, is when strictly considered, only a macroscopic quantity that refers to the whole system, and is not a dynamical variable and in general does not act as a local potential that describes local physical forces. Under special circumstances it can metaphorically be thought of as if the thermal variables behaved like local physical forces. The approximation that constitutes classical irreversible thermodynamics is built on this metaphoric thinking.

As indicated by the quotation marks of Onsager (1931), such a metaphorical but not categorically mechanical force, the thermal "force", $X_{th}$, 'drives' the conduction of heat. For this so-called "thermodynamic force", we can write

$$X_{th} = - \frac{1}{T} \nabla T$$.

Actually this thermal "thermodynamic force" is a manifestation of the degree of inexact specification of the microscopic initial conditions for the system, expressed in the thermodynamic variable known as temperature, $T$. Temperature is only one example, and all the thermodynamic macroscopic variables constitute inexact specifications of the initial conditions, and have their respective "thermodynamic forces". These inexactitudes of specification are the source of the apparent fluctuations that drive the generation of dynamical structure, of the very precise but still less than perfect reproducibility of non-equilibrium experiments, and of the place of entropy in thermodynamics. If one did not know of such inexactitude of specification, one might find the origin of the fluctuations mysterious. What is meant here by "inexactitude of specification" is not that the mean values of the macroscopic variables are inexactly specified, but that the use of macroscopic variables to describe processes that actually occur by the motions and interactions of microscopic objects such as molecules is necessarily lacking in the molecular detail of the processes, and is thus inexact. There are many microscopic states compatible with a single macroscopic state, but only the latter is specified, and that is specified exactly for the purposes of the theory.

It is reproducibility in repeated observations that identifies dynamical structure in a system. E.T. Jaynes explains how this reproducibility is why entropy is so important in this topic: entropy is a measure of experimental reproducibility. The entropy tells how many times one would have to repeat the experiment in order to expect to see a departure from the usual reproducible result. When the process goes on in a system with less than a 'practically infinite' number (much much less than Avogadro's or Loschmidt's numbers) of molecules, the thermodynamic reproducibility fades, and fluctuations become easier to see.

According to this view of Jaynes, it is a common and confusing abuse of language, that one often sees reproducibility of dynamical structure called "order". Dewar writes "Jaynes considered reproducibility - rather than disorder - to be the key idea behind the second law of thermodynamics (Jaynes 1963, 1965, 1988, 1989)." Grandy (2008) in section 4.3 on page 55 clarifies the distinction between the idea that entropy is related to order (which he considers to be an "unfortunate" "mischaracterization" that needs "debunking"), and the aforementioned idea of Jaynes that entropy is a measure of experimental reproducibility of process (which Grandy regards as correct). According to this view, even the admirable book of Glansdorff and Prigogine (1971) is guilty of this unfortunate abuse of language.

== Local thermodynamic equilibrium ==
Various principles have been proposed by diverse authors for over a century. According to Glansdorff and Prigogine (1971, page 15), in general, these principles apply only to systems that can be described by thermodynamical variables, in which dissipative processes dominate by excluding large deviations from statistical equilibrium. The thermodynamical variables are defined subject to the kinematical requirement of local thermodynamic equilibrium. This means that collisions between molecules are so frequent that chemical and radiative processes do not disrupt the local Maxwell-Boltzmann distribution of molecular velocities.

== Linear and non-linear processes ==
Dissipative structures can depend on the presence of non-linearity in their dynamical régimes. Autocatalytic reactions provide examples of non-linear dynamics, and may lead to the natural evolution of self-organized dissipative structures.

== Continuous and discontinuous motions of fluids ==
Much of the theory of classical non-equilibrium thermodynamics is concerned with the spatially continuous motion of fluids, but fluids can also move with spatial discontinuities. Helmholtz (1868) wrote about how in a flowing fluid, there can arise a zero fluid pressure, which sees the fluid broken asunder. This arises from the momentum of the fluid flow, showing a different kind of dynamical structure from that of the conduction of heat or electricity. Thus for example: water from a nozzle can form a shower of droplets (Rayleigh 1878, and in section 357 et seq. of Rayleigh (1896/1926)); waves on the surface of the sea break discontinuously when they reach the shore (Thom 1975). Helmholtz pointed out that the sounds of organ pipes must arise from such discontinuity of flow, occasioned by the passage of air past a sharp-edged obstacle; otherwise the oscillatory character of the sound wave would be damped away to nothing. The definition of the rate of entropy production of such a flow is not covered by the usual theory of classical non-equilibrium thermodynamics. There are many other commonly observed discontinuities of fluid flow that also lie beyond the scope of the classical theory of non-equilibrium thermodynamics, such as: bubbles in boiling liquids and in effervescent drinks; also protected towers of deep tropical convection (Riehl, Malkus 1958), also called penetrative convection (Lindzen 1977).

== Historical development ==
=== W. Thomson, Baron Kelvin ===
William Thomson, later Baron Kelvin, (1852 a, 1852 b) wrote

"II. When heat is created by any unreversible process (such as friction), there is a dissipation of mechanical energy, and a full restoration of it to its primitive condition is impossible.

III. When heat is diffused by conduction, there is a dissipation of mechanical energy, and perfect restoration is impossible.

IV. When radiant heat or light is absorbed, otherwise than in vegetation, or in a chemical reaction, there is a dissipation of mechanical energy, and perfect restoration is impossible."

In 1854, Thomson wrote about the relation between two previously known non-equilibrium effects. In the Peltier effect, an electric current driven by an external electric field across a bimetallic junction will cause heat to be carried across the junction when the temperature gradient is constrained to zero. In the Seebeck effect, a flow of heat driven by a temperature gradient across such a junction will cause an electromotive force across the junction when the electric current is constrained to zero. Thus thermal and electric effects are said to be coupled. Thomson (1854) proposed a theoretical argument, partly based on the work of Carnot and Clausius, and in those days partly simply speculative, that the coupling constants of these two effects would be found experimentally to be equal. Experiment later confirmed this proposal. It was later one of the ideas that led Onsager to his results as noted below.

=== Helmholtz ===
In 1869, Hermann von Helmholtz stated his Helmholtz minimum dissipation theorem, subject to a certain kind of boundary condition, a principle of least viscous dissipation of kinetic energy: "For a steady flow in a viscous liquid, with the speeds of flow on the boundaries of the fluid being given steady, in the limit of small speeds, the currents in the liquid so distribute themselves that the dissipation of kinetic energy by friction is minimum."

In 1878, Helmholtz, like Thomson also citing Carnot and Clausius, wrote about electric current in an electrolyte solution with a concentration gradient. This shows a non-equilibrium coupling, between electric effects and concentration-driven diffusion. Like Thomson (Kelvin) as noted above, Helmholtz also found a reciprocal relation, and this was another of the ideas noted by Onsager.

=== J. W. Strutt, Baron Rayleigh ===
Rayleigh (1873) (and in Sections 81 and 345 of Rayleigh (1896/1926)) introduced the dissipation function for the description of dissipative processes involving viscosity. More general versions of this function have been used by many subsequent investigators of the nature of dissipative processes and dynamical structures. Rayleigh's dissipation function was conceived of from a mechanical viewpoint, and it did not refer in its definition to temperature, and it needed to be 'generalized' to make a dissipation function suitable for use in non-equilibrium thermodynamics.

Studying jets of water from a nozzle, Rayleigh (1878, 1896/1926) noted that when a jet is in a state of conditionally stable dynamical structure, the mode of fluctuation most likely to grow to its full extent and lead to another state of conditionally stable dynamical structure is the one with the fastest growth rate. In other words, a jet can settle into a conditionally stable state, but it is likely to suffer fluctuation so as to pass to another, less unstable, conditionally stable state. He used like reasoning in a study of Bénard convection. These physically lucid considerations of Rayleigh seem to contain the heart of the distinction between the principles of minimum and maximum rates of dissipation of energy and entropy production, which have been developed in the course of physical investigations by later authors.

=== Korteweg ===
Korteweg (1883) gave a proof "that in any simply connected region, when the velocities along the boundaries are given, there exists, as far as the squares and products of the velocities may be neglected, only one solution of the equations for the steady motion of an incompressible viscous fluid, and that this solution is always stable." He attributed the first part of this theorem to Helmholtz, who had shown that it is a simple consequence of a theorem that "if the motion be steady, the currents in a viscous [incompressible] fluid are so distributed that the loss of [kinetic] energy due to viscosity is a minimum, on the supposition that the velocities along boundaries of the fluid are given." Because of the restriction to cases in which the squares and products of the velocities can be neglected, these motions are below the threshold for turbulence.

=== Onsager ===
Great theoretical progress was made by Onsager in 1931 and in 1953.

=== Prigogine ===
Further progress was made by Prigogine in 1945 and later. Prigogine (1947) cites Onsager (1931).

=== Casimir ===
Casimir (1945) extended the theory of Onsager.

=== Ziman ===
Ziman (1956) gave very readable account. He proposed the following as a general principle of the thermodynamics of irreversible processes: "Consider all distributions of currents such that the intrinsic entropy production equals the extrinsic entropy production for the given set of forces. Then, of all current distributions satisfying this condition, the steady state distribution makes the entropy production a maximum." He commented that this was a known general principle, discovered by Onsager, but was "not quoted in any of the books on the subject". He notes the difference between this principle and "Prigogine's theorem, which states, crudely speaking, that if not all the forces acting on a system are fixed the free forces will take such values as to make the entropy production a minimum." Prigogine was present when this paper was read and he is reported by the journal editor to have given "notice that he doubted the validity of part of Ziman's thermodynamic interpretation".

=== Ziegler ===
Hans Ziegler extended the Melan-Prager non-equilibrium theory of materials to the non-isothermal case.

=== Gyarmati ===
Gyarmati (1967/1970) gives a systematic presentation, and extends Onsager's principle of least dissipation of energy, to give a more symmetric form known as Gyarmati's principle. Gyarmati (1967/1970) cites 11 papers or books authored or co-authored by Prigogine.

Gyarmati (1967/1970) also gives in Section III 5 a very helpful precis of the subtleties of Casimir (1945)). He explains that the Onsager reciprocal relations concern variables which are even functions of the velocities of the molecules, and notes that Casimir went on to derive anti-symmetric relations concerning variables which are odd functions of the velocities of the molecules.

=== Paltridge ===
The physics of the earth's atmosphere includes dramatic events like lightning and the effects of volcanic eruptions, with discontinuities of motion such as noted by Helmholtz (1868). Turbulence is prominent in atmospheric convection. Other discontinuities include the formation of raindrops, hailstones, and snowflakes. The usual theory of classical non-equilibrium thermodynamics will need some extension to cover atmospheric physics. According to Tuck (2008), "On the macroscopic level, the way has been pioneered by a meteorologist (Paltridge 1975, 2001). Initially Paltridge (1975) used the terminology "minimum entropy exchange", but after that, for example in Paltridge (1978), and in Paltridge (1979)), he used the now current terminology "maximum entropy production" to describe the same thing. This point is clarified in the review by Ozawa, Ohmura, Lorenz, Pujol (2003). Paltridge (1978) cited Busse's (1967) fluid mechanical work concerning an extremum principle. Nicolis and Nicolis (1980) discuss Paltridge's work, and they comment that the behaviour of the entropy production is far from simple and universal. This seems natural in the context of the requirement of some classical theory of non-equilibrium thermodynamics that the threshold of turbulence not be crossed. Paltridge himself nowadays tends to prefer to think in terms of the dissipation function rather than in terms of rate of entropy production.

== Speculated thermodynamic extremum principles for energy dissipation and entropy production ==
Jou, Casas-Vazquez, Lebon (1993) note that classical non-equilibrium thermodynamics "has seen an extraordinary expansion since the second world war", and they refer to the Nobel prizes for work in the field awarded to Lars Onsager and Ilya Prigogine. Martyushev and Seleznev (2006) note the importance of entropy in the evolution of natural dynamical structures: "Great contribution has been done in this respect by two scientists, namely Clausius, ... , and Prigogine." Prigogine in his 1977 Nobel Lecture said: "... non-equilibrium may be a source of order. Irreversible processes may lead to a new type of dynamic states of matter which I have called “dissipative structures”." Glansdorff and Prigogine (1971) wrote on page xx: "Such 'symmetry breaking instabilities' are of special interest as they lead to a spontaneous 'self-organization' of the system both from the point of view of its space order and its function."

Analyzing the Rayleigh–Bénard convection cell phenomenon, Chandrasekhar (1961) wrote "Instability occurs at the minimum temperature gradient at which a balance can be maintained between the kinetic energy dissipated by viscosity and the internal energy released by the buoyancy force." With a temperature gradient greater than the minimum, viscosity can dissipate kinetic energy as fast as it is released by convection due to buoyancy, and a steady state with convection is stable. The steady state with convection is often a pattern of macroscopically visible hexagonal cells with convection up or down in the middle or at the 'walls' of each cell, depending on the temperature dependence of the quantities; in the atmosphere under various conditions it seems that either is possible. (Some details are discussed by Lebon, Jou, and Casas-Vásquez (2008) on pages 143–158.) With a temperature gradient less than the minimum, viscosity and heat conduction are so effective that convection cannot keep going.

Glansdorff and Prigogine (1971) on page xv wrote "Dissipative structures have a quite different [from equilibrium structures] status: they are formed and maintained through the effect of exchange of energy and matter in non-equilibrium conditions." They were referring to the dissipation function of Rayleigh (1873) that was used also by Onsager (1931, I, 1931, II). On pages 78–80 of their book Glansdorff and Prigogine (1971) consider the stability of laminar flow that was pioneered by Helmholtz; they concluded that at a stable steady state of sufficiently slow laminar flow, the dissipation function was minimum.

These advances have led to proposals for various extremal principles for the "self-organized" régimes that are possible for systems governed by classical linear and non-linear non-equilibrium thermodynamical laws, with stable stationary régimes being particularly investigated. Convection introduces effects of momentum which appear as non-linearity in the dynamical equations. In the more restricted case of no convective motion, Prigogine wrote of "dissipative structures". Šilhavý (1997) offers the opinion that "... the extremum principles of [equilibrium] thermodynamics ... do not have any counterpart for [non-equilibrium] steady states (despite many claims in the literature)."

=== Prigogine's proposed theorem of minimum entropy production for very slow purely diffusive transfer ===
In 1945 Prigogine (see also Prigogine (1947)) proposed a “Theorem of Minimum Entropy Production” which applies only to the purely diffusive linear regime, with negligible inertial terms, near a stationary thermodynamically non-equilibrium state. Prigogine's proposal is that the rate of entropy production is locally minimum at every point. The proof offered by Prigogine is open to serious criticism. A critical and unsupportive discussion of Prigogine's proposal is offered by Grandy (2008). It has been shown by Barbera that the total whole body entropy production cannot be minimum, but this paper did not consider the pointwise minimum proposal of Prigogine. A proposal closely related to Prigogine's is that the pointwise rate of entropy production should have its maximum value minimized at the steady state. This is compatible, but not identical, with the Prigogine proposal. Moreover, N. W. Tschoegl proposes a proof, perhaps more physically motivated than Prigogine's, that would if valid support the conclusion of Helmholtz and of Prigogine, that under these restricted conditions, the entropy production is at a pointwise minimum.

=== Faster transfer with convective circulation: second entropy ===
In contrast to the case of sufficiently slow transfer with linearity between flux and generalized force with negligible inertial terms, there can be heat transfer that is not very slow. Then there is consequent non-linearity, and heat flow can develop into phases of convective circulation. In these cases, the time rate of entropy production has been shown to be a non-monotonic function of time during the approach to steady state heat convection. This makes these cases different from the near-thermodynamic-equilibrium regime of very-slow-transfer with linearity. Accordingly, the local time rate of entropy production, defined according to the local thermodynamic equilibrium hypothesis, is not an adequate variable for prediction of the time course of far-from-thermodynamic equilibrium processes. The principle of minimum entropy production is not applicable to these cases.

To cover these cases, there is needed at least one further state variable, a non-equilibrium quantity, the so-called second entropy. This appears to be a step towards generalization beyond the classical second law of thermodynamics, to cover non-equilibrium states or processes. The classical law refers only to states of thermodynamic equilibrium, and local thermodynamic equilibrium theory is an approximation that relies upon it. Still it is invoked to deal with phenomena near but not at thermodynamic equilibrium, and has some uses then. But the classical law is inadequate for description of the time course of processes far from thermodynamic equilibrium. For such processes, a more powerful theory is needed, and the second entropy is part of such a theory.

=== Speculated principles of maximum entropy production and minimum energy dissipation ===
Onsager (1931, I) wrote: "Thus the vector field J of the heat flow is described by the condition that the rate of increase of entropy, less the dissipation function, be a maximum." Careful note needs to be taken of the opposite signs of the rate of entropy production and of the dissipation function, appearing in the left-hand side of Onsager's equation (5.13) on Onsager's page 423.

Although largely unnoticed at the time, Ziegler proposed an idea early with his work in the mechanics of plastics in 1961, and later in his book on thermomechanics revised in 1983, and in various papers (e.g., Ziegler (1987),). Ziegler never stated his principle as a universal law but he may have intuited this. He demonstrated his principle using vector space geometry based on an “orthogonality condition” which only worked in systems where the velocities were defined as a single vector or tensor, and thus, as he wrote at p. 347, was “impossible to test by means of macroscopic mechanical models”, and was, as he pointed out, invalid in “compound systems where several elementary processes take place simultaneously”.

In relation to the earth's atmospheric energy transport process, according to Tuck (2008), "On the macroscopic level, the way has been pioneered by a meteorologist (Paltridge 1975, 2001)." Initially Paltridge (1975) used the terminology "minimum entropy exchange", but after that, for example in Paltridge (1978), and in Paltridge (1979), he used the now current terminology "maximum entropy production" to describe the same thing. The logic of Paltridge's earlier work is open to serious criticism. Nicolis and Nicolis (1980) discuss Paltridge's work, and they comment that the behaviour of the entropy production is far from simple and universal. Later work by Paltridge focuses more on the idea of a dissipation function than on the idea of rate of production of entropy.

Sawada (1981), also in relation to the Earth's atmospheric energy transport process, postulating a principle of largest amount of entropy increment per unit time, cites work in fluid mechanics by Malkus and Veronis (1958) as having "proven a principle of maximum heat current, which in turn is a maximum entropy production for a given boundary condition", but this inference is not logically valid. Again investigating planetary atmospheric dynamics, Shutts (1981) used an approach to the definition of entropy production, different from Paltridge's, to investigate a more abstract way to check the principle of maximum entropy production, and reported a good fit.

=== Prospects ===
Until recently, prospects for useful extremal principles in this area have seemed clouded. C. Nicolis (1999) concludes that one model of atmospheric dynamics has an attractor which is not a regime of maximum or minimum dissipation; she says this seems to rule out the existence of a global organizing principle, and comments that this is to some extent disappointing; she also points to the difficulty of finding a thermodynamically consistent form of entropy production. Another top expert offers an extensive discussion of the possibilities for principles of extrema of entropy production and of dissipation of energy: Chapter 12 of Grandy (2008) is very cautious, and finds difficulty in defining the 'rate of internal entropy production' in many cases, and finds that sometimes for the prediction of the course of a process, an extremum of the quantity called the rate of dissipation of energy may be more useful than that of the rate of entropy production; this quantity appeared in Onsager's 1931 origination of this subject. Other writers have also felt that prospects for general global extremal principles are clouded. Such writers include Glansdorff and Prigogine (1971), Lebon, Jou and Casas-Vásquez (2008), and Šilhavý (1997). It has been shown that heat convection does not obey extremal principles for entropy production and chemical reactions do not obey extremal principles for the secondary differential of entropy production, hence the development of a general extremal principle seems infeasible.

== See also ==
- Non-equilibrium thermodynamics
- Dissipative system
- Self-organization
- Autocatalytic reactions and order creation
- Fluctuation theorem
- Fluctuation dissipation theorem
