= Hans Ziegler (physicist) =

Swiss physicist

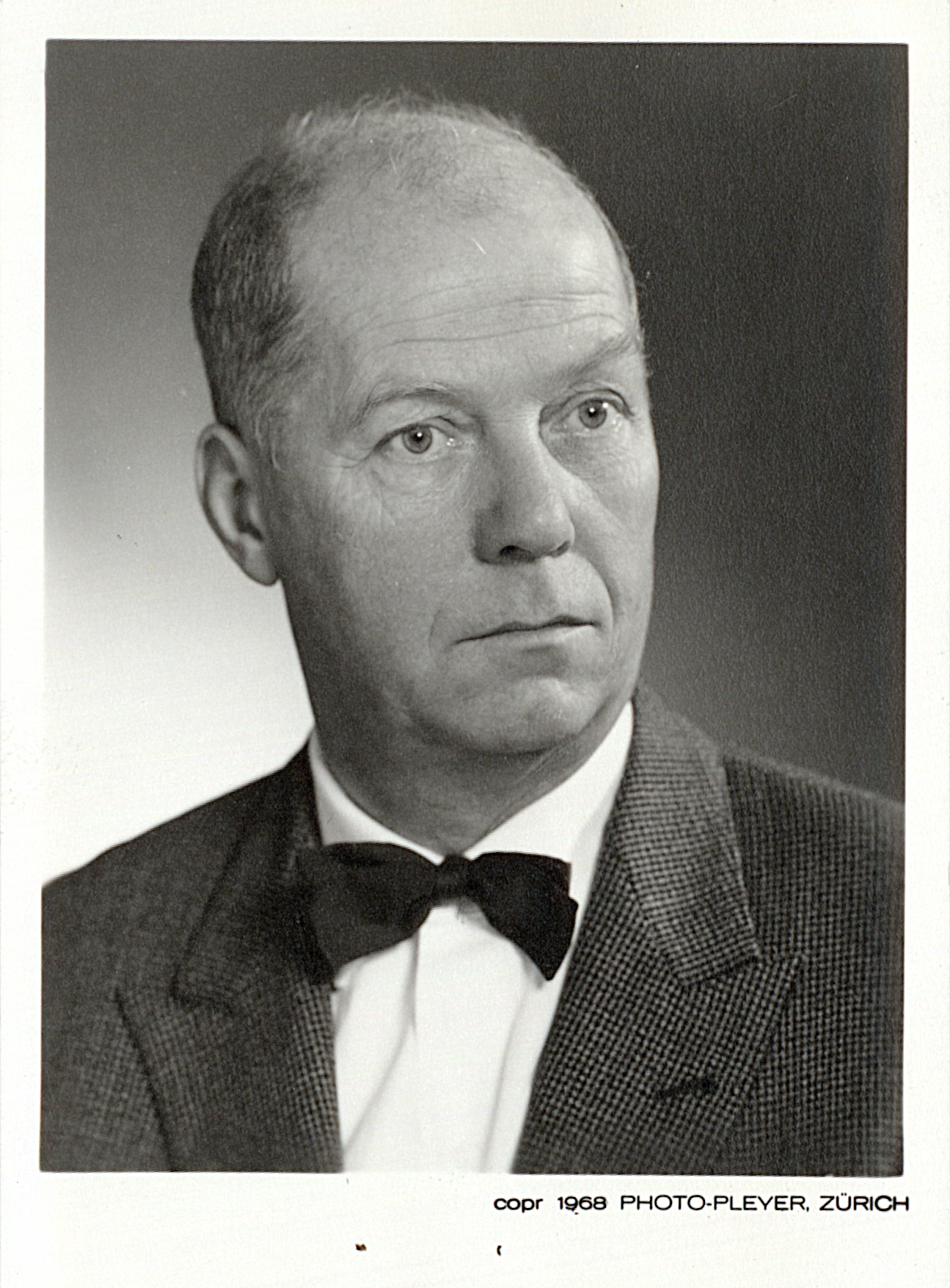
- Born: 5 September 1910; Winterthur, Switzerland
- Died: 5 August 1985 (aged 74); Estes Park, Colorado, USA
- Education: ETH
- Scientific career
- Fields: Thermodynamics
- Workplaces: ETH; University of Stuttgart; Brown University; Massachusetts Institute of Technology; Ohio State University

Hans Ziegler was born in Winterthur, Switzerland, on 5 September 1910, and died in Estes Park, Colorado, on 5 August 1985. He was raised and spent his early career in Switzerland but much of his later career in the United States.

Hans Ziegler was an academic and was the author of textbooks on engineering and thermodynamics, which were translated into other languages, and re-issued in new editions.

In non-equilibrium thermodynamics, he considered a 'principle of maximum dissipation rate'. He was also an early proponent of a 'principle of maximum rate of entropy production', which is closely related to a 'principle of maximum dissipation rate'. The range of applicability and validity or invalidity of these 'principles' has been examined and debated by many others, and their eventual scientific status is yet to be settled.
