= Godiva's Hymn =

Traditional drinking song for engineers

"Godiva's Hymn", "Engineer's Hymn" or "Engineers' Drinking Song" is a traditional drinking song for North American engineers. Versions of it have been associated with the Army Corps of Engineers, as well as MIT, MTU, and various other universities, and is now often performed by the MIT a cappella group The Chorallaries. In many university engineering faculties, military engineering corps and other engineering organizations and societies, Lady Godiva is a school icon or mascot.

Godiva's Hymn is sung either to the tune of "The Battle Hymn of the Republic" or "The Son of a Gambolier". Near Christmas, it is a tradition of the Lady Godiva Memorial Bnad [sic] of the University of Toronto to sing Godiva's Hymn to the tune of Good King Wenceslaus.

One Version of the Chorus is as follows:

We are We are We are We are--
We are the engineers--
We can We can We can We can--
Demolish forty beers--
Drink rum Drink rum Drink rum all day--
and come along with us for--
We don't give a damn for any old man--
Who don't give a damn for us--

Four of Godiva's Verses:

Godiva was a lady who through Coventry did ride--
To show to all the villagers her fine and lily-white hide--
The most observant villager, an engineer of course--
Was the only one to notice that Godiva rode a horse--

Professors put demands on us, they say we have to tool,--
But all we want to do is sleep, we hate this fucking school.--
You can bitch or tell us off, even abuse us if you please,--
But we're all set to graduate, and all we need are C's!--

Venus is a statue made entirely of stone,--
There's not a fig leaf on her, she's as naked as a bone.--
On noticing her arms were gone, an Engineer discoursed,--
"The damn thing's busted concrete and it should be reinforced."--

An Engineer once came to class so drunk and very late,--
He stumbled through the lecture hall at an ever-diminishing rate.--
The only things that held him up and kept him on his course,--
Were the boundary condition and the electromotive force.--

== UAlberta GNCTR Spirit ==
This is not a variant on Godiva’s hymn. This is an unrelated school fight song set to the same tune.

UAlberta created three verses that revolved around their theme of WWSki. (Click on Citation)

We are, we are, the UofA we’re up against the ropes,
But don’t get to excited cause we’re here to crush your hopes
Prepare, prepare, prepare yourself we’re going to choke slam you
Not only that, but we’ve been known to slam some v-gades too!

Building sleds and throwing punches that is what we do
If you challenge UofA then you better bring your crew
Out shorts are tight our sled fast well leave you in the clear
Oh no our Design forgot the parts, our toboggan doesn’t steer

We're the ualberta wrestling crew, We're sure to pin you down;
We like it rough and won't hold back we'll knock you all around;
So throw your hat into the ring; to anyone who dares;
You'll run out of challengers; Before we're out of chairs!

Note: the toboggan in this song refers to the UofA long lasting concrete toboggan club

== Michigan Technological University ==
The Huskies Pep Band often performs a variant of the Engineer's Song at most events. While keeping the basic roots of the original song, the band adds verses unique to the University; The chorus and verses recalling the lyricist’s rough beginnings as the child of a prostitute and a miner in Alaska remain staples of the Huskies Pep Band to this day. The Band adds a total of 3 verses to the original chorus.

We are, We are, We are, We are, We are the Engineers!
We can, We can, We can, We can drink all of forty beers!
Drink up, Drink up, Drink up, Drink up and come along with us,
For we don't give a damn for any man who don't give a damn for us!

My father was a miner on the upper Malamute,
My mother was a hostess at a house of ill repute.
And at the tender age of three, they threw me on my ear,
And there was nothing left for me to do but become an Engineer!

We are, We are, We are, We are, We are, We are, We are,
We are, We are, We are, We are, We are, We are, We are,
We are, We are, We are, We are, We are, We are, We are,
We are, We are, We are!

Sieve, Sieve, Sieve, Sieve, Sieve,
Sieve, Sieve, Sieve, Sieve, Sieve,
Sieve, Sieve, Sieve, Sieve, Sieve,
Sieve, Sieve, Sieve, Sieve, Sieve!

Beer, Beer, Beer, Beer, Beer,
Beer, Beer, Beer, Beer, Beer,
Beer, Beer, Beer, Beer, Beer,
Beer, Beer, Beer, Beer, Beer!

== Parody version ==
A bawdy parody of the engineer's song, known as Round and Round Went the Great Big Wheel, was famously recorded during the 1940s by Oscar Brand. It later served as the inspiration for an episode of Dad's Army.

An engineer told me before he died
And I have no reason to say he lied
That though he tried throughout his life
He could never satisfy his wife

Round and round went the great big wheel
In and out went the rod of steel
I'll lay you money on a surefire bet
That the great big wheel is a-turning yet

So he mounted up a great big wheel
And there upon set a rod of steel
Two brass balls were filled with cream
And the whole darn thing was run by steam

Round and round went the great big wheel
In and out went the rod of steel
I'll lay you money on a surefire bet
That the great big wheel is a-turning yet

Then he rolled it up to the bedroom door
And the wheel started up with a mighty roar
It rolled to the bedpost and rolled on top
And pumped his wife til she hollered stop

Round and round went the great big wheel
In and out went the rod of steel
I'll lay you money on a surefire bet
That the great big wheel is a-turning yet

But the great big wheel went right on through
Til the engineer's wife was split in two
Then as if possessed by a monstrous whim
It turned around and mounted him

Round and round went the great big wheel
In and out went the rod of steel
I'll lay you money on a surefire bet
That the great big wheel is a-turning yet

Then it rolled through the streets and into town
Mounting people up and down
Covered them all with grease and cream
And disappeared in a cloud of steam

Round and round went the great big wheel
In and out went the rod of steel
I'll lay you money on a surefire bet
That the great big wheel is a-turning yet

So if some day you should see a wheel
With two brass balls and a rod of steel
Run to the prairie, run to the hill
Unless you're looking for a longtime thrill

Round and round went the great big wheel
In and out went the rod of steel
I'll lay you money on a surefire bet
That the great big wheel is a-turning yet
