= The Human Factor: Revolutionizing the Way We Live with Technology =

Book by Kim Vicente

The Human Factor
- Author: Kim Vicente
- Language: English
- Publisher: Random House of Canada
- Publication date: 2004
- Publication place: Canada
- Media type: Print
- Pages: 368
- ISBN: 0-415-97064-4

The Human Factor: Revolutionizing the Way People Live with Technology (ISBN 0-415-97064-4) is a book by Kim Vicente that Routledge published in 2004. Vicente asserts (as cited in the Optimize article listed in the "References" section) technology in such constructs as hospitals, airplanes, and nuclear power plants have significant room for improvement. Some of the specific industrial accidents Vicente analyzes are the Walkerton Tragedy and the Chernobyl Disaster. Also, for medical error, he details many fatal vincristine dosage errors.

== Contents ==
Preface

Part One - Technology Wreaking Havoc

In this section Vicente gives examples of technology in modern life where Human-tech design could have helped increase effectiveness or even prevent disasters such as the Chernobyl Disaster.

Part Two - Technology For Humans

Part 2 of The Human Factor titled "Technology for Humans" is organized according to what Vicente calls "The Human-tech Ladder". This ladder consists of five levels relating to Human-tech design principles. These levels include physical, psychological, team, organizational, and political elements. Each section of the second part of The Human Factor focuses on one of these design principles, explaining fully how they relate to design and giving examples that exemplify them.

Part Three - Regaining Control Of Our Lives

In this final section Vicente outlines a way to put his design viewpoint into practice. He enumerates steps for not only those in design teams but consumers as well.
