= Extended irreversible thermodynamics =

Extended irreversible thermodynamics is a branch of non-equilibrium thermodynamics that goes beyond the local equilibrium hypothesis of classical irreversible thermodynamics. The space of state variables is enlarged by including the fluxes of mass, momentum and energy and eventually higher order fluxes. The formalism is well-suited for describing high-frequency processes and small-length scales materials.

== Overview ==
Over the last decades, many efforts have been displayed to generalize the classical laws of Fourier (heat conduction), Fick (matter diffusion), Newton (viscous flows) and Ohm (electrical transport). Indeed, modern technology strives towards miniaturized devices, high frequency and strongly non-linear processes requiring for a new conceptual approach. Several classes of theories have been developed with this objective and one of them, known under the heading of Extended Irreversible Thermodynamics (EIT) has raised a particular growing interest. The paternity of EIT can be traced back to James Clerk Maxwell who in 1867 introduced time derivative terms in the constitutive equations of ideal gases.

== Basic concepts ==
The basic idea underlying EIT is to upgrade to the status of independent variables the non-equilibrium internal energy, matter, momentum and electrical fluxes. The choice of the fluxes as variables finds its roots in Grad's thirteen-moment kinetic theory of gases, which therefore provides the natural basis for the development of EIT. The main consequence of the selection of fluxes as state variables is that the constitutive equations of Fourier, Fick, Newton and Ohm are replaced by first-order time evolution equations including memory and non-local effects. The selection of the fluxes as variables is not a mere arbitrary act if it is recalled that in the everyday life, fluxes may play a leading role as for instance in traffic control (flux of cars), economy (flux of money), and the World Wide Web (flux of information).

== An extension of classical irreversible thermodynamics ==
EIT can be viewed as the natural extension of Classical Irreversible Thermodynamics (CIT).

Mainly developed by the Belgian-Dutch school headed by Ilya Prigogine, working on a simple hypothesis of local thermodynamic equilibrium, CIT assumes the existence of field laws of the diffusion type. Mathematically, these are parabolic partial differential equations. They entail that a locally applied disturbance propagates at infinite velocity across the body. This contradicts both experimental evidence and the principle of causality. The latter requires that an effect comes after the application of its cause.

In EIT, the idea of local thermodynamic equilibrium is abandoned. In contrast with CIT, the field equations of EIT are hyperbolic circumventing the paradox of signals moving at infinite velocity.

== Applications ==
The range of applications of EIT is not limited to situations near equilibrium but encompasses several and various domains including

- memory effects (fast processes, polymers, superfluids),
- non-local effects (micro- and nano-materials),
- non-linear effects (high powers, shock waves).

However, the discussion is not closed. Several fundamental questions as the definition of a non-equilibrium entropy and temperature, the status of the Second law of thermodynamics, a univocal choice of state variables receive only partial responses and ask for more definitive answers.
