= Duane McRuer =

Vehicle controls scientist, cofounder of Systems Technology Inc.

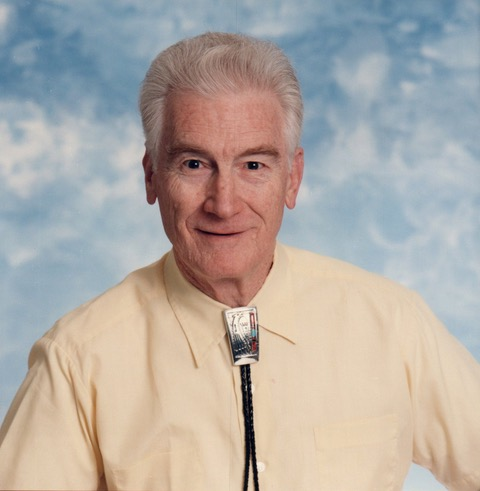
- Born: Duane Torrance McRuer; October 25, 1925; Bakersfield, California, U.S.
- Died: January 24, 2007 (aged 81); Manhattan Beach, California, U.S.
- Education: California Institute of Technology (BS, MS)
- Occupations: Scientist and Engineer; Vehicle Controls Expert; Entrepreneur

Duane Torrance "Mac" McRuer (October 25, 1925 – January 24, 2007) was a scientist, engineer, and expert in aircraft flight and other vehicle controls who cofounded Systems Technology Inc. in 1957. He made many contributions to the theory and practical application of human-machine interaction and control.

== Early life and education ==
McRuer's father, John Torrance McRuer, and his mother, Ruth Inez Bartlett, graduated from Park College in Parkville, Missouri in 1910. John later graduated with a master's degree in education from Stanford University, and worked in education throughout his professional life as an instructor and administrator. Ruth developed McRuer's interest in academic pursuits by encouraging him to read and study.

McRuer was born in Bakersfield, and spent the early years of his life in California's Central Valley. His family moved to Los Angeles when he was ten years old, which afforded him close proximity to the various museums at Exposition Park, along with the University of Southern California campus. McRuer was a voracious reader, a habit that made him a polymath.

McRuer served in the US Navy during World War II as a lieutenant, and worked on anti-submarine techniques. He earned a Bachelor of Science degree in Mechanical Engineering in 1945 and a Master of Science degree in Electrical Engineering in 1948, both from the California Institute of Technology.

== Northrop Corporation ==
Upon graduation from Caltech, McRuer went to work for the Northrop Corporation. He developed expertise in aircraft flight controls, and made some of the first practical applications of theories developed in academia to hydraulically actuated aircraft. McRuer became the Technology Chief of Flight Controls at the company. He was mentored and befriended by Jack Northrop, a relationship that lasted throughout Northrop's life.

McRuer played a key role in flight control developments for the Northrop N-9M flying wing, an early forerunner of the B-2 Spirit. He also co-invented the sideslip-stability augmenter to reduce Dutch roll, and was one of the first to develop automatic stability systems for aircraft.

== Systems Technology Inc. ==
In 1957 McRuer, his wife Betty, and Northrop engineer Irving Ashkenas co-founded Systems Technology Inc. (STI) in Hawthorne, CA. The company provided research and development consulting to the aircraft and nascent aerospace industries. Later contracts came from both the private and public sector for studies on the interplay of human behavior and a wide variety of dynamical systems. Human-vehicle studies expanded beyond aircraft to include automobiles, trucks, and military vehicles.

STI's reputation for what became known as manual control theory garnered international interest. In 1960 the Franklin Institute awarded McRuer and his coauthor Ezra Krendel its Levy Medal for their studies of human dynamic behavior, in particular the paper "The Human Operator as a Servo System Element". McRuer traveled to speak at professional meetings and symposiums around the world. He retired as president of STI in 1993, but remained chairman of the board. For the 1992–1993 academic year, he served as the Jerome C. Hunsaker Visiting Professor of Aerospace Systems at MIT, and delivered the Mina Martin Lecture "Human Dynamics and Pilot-Induced Oscillations".

== Other technical work ==
McRuers's crossover model is a mathematical description of a dynamical system operated by a human being, and is foundational in the field of human-machine interaction. The system is typically a vehicle such as an aircraft or automobile. Use of this model led to the design of vehicles with improved performance, safety, and ease of operation. McRuer's books and monographs included "Aircraft Dynamics and Automatic Control," coauthored with Dunstan Graham and Irving Ashkenas. He co-authored "Analysis of Nonlinear Control Systems," also with Graham. His work continues to be cited in modern textbooks on aircraft control.

McRuer was also involved in government and professional service. He was an advisor to NASA on the flight control system of the Space Shuttle. Later, while serving on the NASA Advisory Council, he advised on the redesign of the International Space Station. He chaired a National Research Council study on the phenomenon of pilot induced oscillations, which produced recommendations for improving aircraft safety. He was a longtime member and leader of the Aerospace Control and Guidance Systems Committee (ACGSC), which organizes technical meetings for the field. He was elected to the National Academy of Engineering in 1988 with the citation "For pioneering application of guidance and control theory and to experimental man-machine interactions."

== Personal life ==
McRuer loved the outdoors, and especially the mountains. This interest began during boyhood experiences exploring Yosemite and General Grant (now Kings Canyon) National Parks with family. He joined the Sierra Club in 1962, and was active in the Angeles Chapter, serving as the chair of the Sierra Peaks Section in 1976. By 1985 he had climbed all of the 297 mountains on the Sierra Peaks list, and later climbed the 97 mountains on the Desert Peaks list twice. His pursuit of list finishing included visiting the highest point in every state save for Alaska.

Recognizing the need for better trained hiking and mountaineering leaders, he wrote the Sierra Club Leadership Reference Book, and edited future versions. This work served as a model for the entire Sierra Club, leading to a set of standards to be a Sierra Club Certified Leader. McRuer taught many snow, rock, and navigation training classes.

McRuer and wife Betty had two children, Lara McRuer and Steven Harsey.

== Awards and honors ==
=== Engineering ===
- 1960 – Franklin Institute Levy Medal (Computer and Cognitive Science)
- 1967 – Fellow of the Institute of Electrical and Electronics Engineers (IEEE)
- 1973 – Fellow of the American Institute of Aeronautics and Astronautics (AIAA)
- 1977 – Fellow of the Society of Automotive Engineers (SAE)
- 1983 – Caltech Distinguished Alumni Award
- 1988 – Member of the National Academy of Engineering (NAE)
- 1998 – SAE Aerospace Engineering Leadership Award
- 2002 – Honorary Fellow of the American Institute of Aeronautics and Astronautics (AIAA)

=== Sierra Club ===
- 1973 – Phil Bernay's Service Award (Angeles Chapter, Hundred Peaks Section)
- 1981 – Chester Versteeg Outings Award (Angeles Chapter)
- 1997 – Oliver Kehrlein Award for Outstanding Leadership (National Organization)
- 1998 – Lifelong Service Award (Angeles Chapter)
- 1998 – Leadership Award (Angeles Chapter, Sierra Peaks Section)
- 1999 – John Backus Leadership Award (Angeles Chapter, Hundred Peaks Section)

== Selected publications ==
=== Books ===
- McRuer DT, Ashkenas IL, Graham D (1974). Aircraft Dynamics and Automatic Control. Princeton, NJ, USA: Princeton University Press. ISBN 9780691630328.
- Graham D, McRuer DT (1961). Analysis of Nonlinear Control Systems. New York, NY, USA: John Wiley.

=== Patents ===
- Flight control system, (1958).
- Sideslip stability augmenter, (1958).
- Longitudinal stability augmenter, (1960).
- Apparatus for measuring operator performance, (1969).

=== Papers ===
- McRuer DT, Krendel ES (1959). "The human operator as a servo system element, Part I". Journal of the Franklin Institute. 267 (5): 381–403. doi:10.1016/0016-0032(59)90091-2.
- McRuer DT, Krendel ES (1959). "The human operator as a servo system element, Part II". Journal of the Franklin Institute. 267 (6): 511–536. doi:10.1016/0016-0032(59)90072-9.
- McRuer DT, Krendel ES (1962). "The man-machine system concept". Proceedings of the IRE. 50 (5): 1117–1123. Bibcode:1962PIRE...50.1117M. doi:10.1109/JRPROC.1962.288016. S2CID 51670165.
- McRuer DT, Jex HR (1967). "A review of quasi-linear pilot models". IEEE Transactions on Human Factors in Electronics. 8 (3): 231–249. Bibcode:1967ITHFE...8..231M. doi:10.1109/THFE.1967.234304. S2CID 56144874.
- McRuer DT, Magdaleno RE, Moore GP (1968). "A neuromuscular actuation system model". IEEE Transactions on Man-Machine Systems. 9 (3): 61–71. Bibcode:1968ITMMS...9...61M. doi:10.1109/TMMS.1968.300039. S2CID 53550303.
- McRuer DT, Weir DH (1969). "Theory of manual vehicular control". Ergonomics. 10 (4): 257–291. doi:10.1080/00140136908931082. PMID 5823971.
- McRuer DT (1973). "Development of pilot-in-the-loop analysis". Journal of Aircraft. 10 (9): 515–524. doi:10.2514/3.44389.
- McRuer DT, Weir DH, Jex HR, Magdaleno RE, Allen RW (1975). "Measurement of driver-vehicle multiloop response properties with a single disturbance input". IEEE Transactions on Systems, Man, and Cybernetics. 5 (5): 490–497. Bibcode:1975ITSMC...5..490M. doi:10.1109/TSMC.1975.5408371. hdl:2060/19750011072. S2CID 22958025.
- McRuer DT (1980). "Human dynamics in man-machine systems". Automatica. 16 (3): 237–253. doi:10.1016/0005-1098(80)90034-5.
- Mcruer DT, Johnston DE, Myers TT (1986). "A perspective on superaugmented flight control: advantages and problems". Journal of Guidance, Control, and Dynamics. 9 (5): 530–540. Bibcode:1986JGCD....9..530M. doi:10.2514/3.20143.
- Mcruer DT, Schmidt DK (1990). "Pilot-vehicle analysis of multi-axis tasks". Journal of Guidance, Control, and Dynamics. 13 (2): 348–355. Bibcode:1990JGCD...13..348M. doi:10.2514/3.20556.
- Bachelder E, McRuer DT, Hansman RJ (2002). Experimental study of 3-D synthetic cues on rotorcraft hover performance. AIAA Atmospheric Flight Mechanics Conference and Exhibit. Monterey, CA, USA. doi:10.2514/6.2002-4873. AIAA 2002-4873.
- Mcruer DT, Graham D (2004). "Flight control century: triumph of the systems approach". Journal of Guidance, Control, and Dynamics. 27 (2): 161–173. Bibcode:2004JGCD...27..161M. doi:10.2514/1.4586.

=== Reports ===
- McRuer DT, Stapleford RL (1963). Sensitivity and Modal Response for Single Loop and Multiloop Systems (PDF) (Report). Flight Control Laboratory. ASD-TR-62-812. Archived (PDF) from the original on February 14, 2022.
- McRuer DT, Krendel ES (1974). Mathematical Models of Human Pilot Behavior (Report). AGARD. AGARD-AG-188. Archived from the original on August 15, 2020.
- McRuer DT, Johnston DE (1975). Flight Control System Properties and Problems (Report). Vol. 1. NASA. NASA-CR-2500.
- McRuer DT, Johnston DE (1975). Flight Control System Properties and Problems (Report). Vol. 2. NASA. NASA-CR-2501.
- Myers TT, McRuer DT, Johnson DE (1984). Flying Qualities and Control System Characteristics for Superaugmented Aircraft (Report). NASA. NASA-CR-170419.
- Klyde D, McRuer DT, Myers TT (1995). Unified Pilot-Induced Oscillation Theory (PDF) (Report). Vol. 1. Wright Laboratory. WL-TR-96-3208. Archived (PDF) from the original on February 14, 2022.
- McRuer DT (1995). Pilot-Induced Oscillations and Human Dynamic Behavior (Report). NASA. NASA-CR-4683.
