= Kim Vicente =

Canadian engineer

- Known for: Human factors

Kim Vicente is an inactive professor of Mechanical and Industrial Engineering at the University of Toronto. He was previously a researcher, teacher, and author in the field of human factors. He is best known for his two books: The Human Factor and Cognitive Work Analysis.

== Education and work experience ==
Kim J. Vicente received a B.A.Sc. in industrial engineering from the University of Toronto in 1985, a M.S. in industrial engineering and operations research from the Virginia Polytechnic Institute and State University in 1987, and a Ph.D. in mechanical engineering from the University of Illinois at Urbana-Champaign in 1991.

During 1987-1988, he spent a formative year as a visiting scientist in the Section for Informatics and Cognitive Science of the Risø National Laboratory in Roskilde, Denmark. During 1991-92, he was on the faculty of the School of Industrial and Systems Engineering at the Georgia Institute of Technology. Currently, he is Professor of Mechanical & Industrial Engineering, Biomaterials & Biomedical Engineering, Computer Science, and Electrical & Computer Engineering at the University of Toronto, and founding director of its Cognitive Engineering Laboratory. He is also an adjunct professor of psychology at Miami University, and a registered Professional Engineer in Ontario. During 2002-03, he was Jerome Clarke Hunsaker Visiting Professor of Aerospace Information Engineering at the Massachusetts Institute of Technology.

== Research contributions ==
Kim has conducted extensive research on how to design technology that works for people in complex sociotechnical systems, and along with Jens Rasmussen, started a new field of research called Ecological Interface Design which has spawned hundreds of articles by researchers from around the globe. He and his students have applied these ideas to a number of diverse application domains, including: animation, aviation, engineering design, medicine, network management, nuclear power, and petrochemical processes. This research has led to 1 patent, many scholarly contributions (2 books, 3 co-edited books, 91 journal articles, 84 conference proceedings papers, 16 book chapters, 18 invited keynote addresses, and 54 technical reports) as well as significant technology transfer to industry, including the radical organizational restructuring of a multi-billion dollar multinational pharmaceutical corporation toward a more systems-oriented approach to design.

In 1999, Kim authored the first textbook in the area of cognitive work analysis, Cognitive Work Analysis: Toward Safe, Productive, and Healthy Computer-based Work, published by Lawrence Erlbaum Associates. His latest book, The Human Factor: Revolutionizing the Way People Live with Technology, was published by Alfred A. Knopf Canada in 2003, Routledge in the US and Les Éditions Logiques in Québec in 2004.

== Media ==
Kim was called upon to give an expert opinion to the media on issues related to people and technology. He has been quoted or his work featured in numerous outlets around the world. He has written for The Globe and Mail as well as the Toronto Star. In 1999, he was chosen by Time magazine as one of 25 Canadians under the age of 40 who is a "Leader for the 21st Century who will shape Canada's future".

== Lecturing and consulting ==
Kim has been invited to lecture in 11 countries on 4 continents, including one lecture tour in Japan and another in Australia. He has acted as a consultant to industry and government, including the Atomic Energy Control Board of Canada, Australian Defence Science and Technology Organisation, Honeywell Technology Center, Microsoft, NASA Ames Research Center, NATO, Nortel Networks, US Institute of Medicine, US National Academy of Engineering, and US Nuclear Regulatory Commission.

== Honours and awards ==
In 1991, Kim received the Brunswik New Investigator Award at the International Invitational Meeting of the Brunswik Society, and the award for the best paper published in the Human Factors Society Bulletin. In 1995, he was a co-recipient of the outstanding abstract award in the area of Clinical Application of Technology from the Society for Technology in Anesthesia. In 1999, he was the recipient of a first-round Premier’s Research Excellence Award, valued at $100,000. Kim was on the Administrative Committee of the IEEE Society for Systems, Man, and Cybernetics, an Associate Editor of the IEEE Transactions on Systems, Man, and Cybernetics, and on the editorial boards of Human Factors and the International Journal of Cognitive Ergonomics. Currently, he serves on the editorial board of Theoretical Issues in Ergonomics Science. In 2002, he became the first engineering professor ever to receive the $100,000 McLean Award, the University of Toronto’s wealthiest and most prestigious prize for outstanding research. He has also received the Outstanding Professional Achievement Award from the Federation of Portuguese-Canadian Business and Professionals (2003), and the COPA Award for Outstanding Vision/Leadership from the Portuguese Canadian National Congress (2004).

Kim is only the second Canadian researcher to be invited to serve on the Committee for Human Factors of the U.S. National Research Council/National Academy of Sciences. He is also a Senior Fellow and a member of the Corporation of Massey College. In 2003, he received the E.W.R. Steacie Memorial Fellowship, Canada’s most prestigious prize for young academics in all areas of science and engineering.

The Human Factor received the National Business Book Award and the Science in Society General Audience Book Award, and was a finalist for the Canadian Booksellers Association Libris Award for Non-fiction Book of the Year.
