= Engineering Institute of Technology =

Coordinates: 31.945639°S 115.840014°E

- Type: Institute
- Established: 2008
- Affiliations: Tertiary Education Quality and Standards Agency, registered training organisation
- Dean: Indumathi V Steve Mackay (CEO)
- Location: West Perth, Perth, Western Australia, Australia
- Campus: Perth, Melbourne and Brisbane, Australia
- Website: Eit.edu.au

The Engineering Institute of Technology (EIT) is a global private college. Founded in 2008, with headquarters in Perth, Australia. EIT is a registered training organisation in the Vocational Education and Training Sector in Australia and is regulated by the Australian Skills Quality Authority.

EIT is also a designated Institute of Higher Education in Australia and is regulated by the Tertiary Education Quality and Standards Agency. EIT is registered to deliver a number of Bachelor of Science and master's degrees in engineering and technology disciplines, as well as a Doctor of Engineering.

== History ==
The Engineering Institute of Technology (EIT) was founded as an affiliate of IDC Technologies by Dr Steve Mackay, the institute's Managing Principal. After its founding, the college proceeded to offer live, online programs presented by industry-based lecturers who are sourced globally. The online EIT campus is accessed by students worldwide. In 2018, EIT opened a campus in Perth, Western Australia and in 2019, another campus in Melbourne, Victoria. A number of degree programs are offered on campus as well as online. More recently, an additional campus was stablished in Brisbane in 2024.

EIT also maintains support offices in the United Kingdom, South Africa. and Bangladesh. These offices are accessible to students worldwide.

During the COVID-19 pandemic, in 2020, the Australian Government and EIT agreed to course funding for short courses in higher education, for Australian and New Zealand citizens.

== Organization and administration ==
The EIT Governance Board leads and guides EIT in the establishment, development, management, and maintenance of the strategies and corporate governing policies. It delegates decision-making authority to the managers and academic governing bodies. The EIT Academic Board provides guidance to the EIT Governance Board on the setting and maintenance of academic standards within EIT. It oversees the academic administration of EIT and develops policies relating to academic operations. Learning Support Officers, and lecturers, administer the different courses and provide direct support to EIT students.

== Academics ==
EIT offers courses for professional development and Australian accredited qualifications in Engineering Management, Civil Engineering, Data Communications, and Industrial IT, Industrial Automation, Instrumentation and Process Control, Electrical Engineering, Electronic Engineering and Mechanical Engineering. The education offered by EIT is embedded in and driven by industry practice. EIT employs a synchronous learning and teaching platform with live, interactive webinars that allows students to interact with lecturers in real-time. Practical applications are accessed through EIT remote laboratories and simulation software.

An online invigilation software, IRIS, is used to uphold the academic integrity of EIT qualifications.

== Facilities and services ==
=== Libraries ===
EIT students have access to electronic libraries and information resources necessary to achieve the outcomes of their qualifications. EIT holds an Educational Copyright License and has a collection of white papers on engineering topics.

== Awards ==
The Engineering Institute of Technology has won the Western Australian International Education and Training Awards in 2015, in 2019 and in 2021. EIT won the overall national Australian International Education and Training Award in 2021.

In 2020, EIT was ranked first out of 55 Australian engineering faculties.

== Rankings and Recognition ==
According to Quality Indicators for Learning and Teaching (QILT) survey data published in 2024, 82.5% of EIT undergraduate engineering students reported a positive overall educational experience.
