= Task analysis =

Analysis of how a task is accomplished

Task analysis is a fundamental tool of human factors engineering. It entails analyzing how a task is accomplished, including a detailed description of both manual and mental activities, task and element durations, task frequency, task allocation, task complexity, environmental conditions, necessary clothing and equipment, and any other unique factors involved in or required for one or more people to perform a given task.

Information from a task analysis can then be used for many purposes, such as personnel selection and training, tool or equipment design, procedure design (e.g., design of checklists, or decision support systems) and automation. Though distinct, task analysis is related to user analysis.

== Applications ==
The term "task" is often used interchangeably with activity or process. Task analysis often results in a hierarchical representation of what steps it takes to perform a task for which there is a goal and for which there is some lowest-level "action" or interaction among humans and/or machines: this is known as hierarchical task analysis. Tasks may be identified and defined at multiple levels of abstraction as required to support the purpose of the analysis. A critical task analysis, for example, is an analysis of human performance requirements which, if not accomplished in accordance with system requirements, will likely have adverse effects on cost, system reliability, efficiency, effectiveness, or safety. Task analysis is often performed by human factors and ergonomics professionals.

Task analysis may be of manual tasks, such as bricklaying, and be analyzed as time and motion studies using concepts from industrial engineering. Cognitive task analysis is applied to modern work environments such as supervisory control where little physical work occurs, but the tasks are more related to situation assessment, decision making, and response planning and execution.

Task analysis is also used in education. It is a model that is applied to classroom tasks to discover which curriculum components are well matched to the capabilities of students with learning disabilities and which task modification might be necessary. It discovers which tasks a person hasn't mastered, and the information processing demands of tasks that are easy or problematic. In behavior modification, it is a breakdown of a complex behavioral sequence into steps. This often serves as the basis for chaining.

The results of task analysis are often represented in task models, which clearly indicate the relations among the various tasks. An example notation used to specify task models is ConcurTaskTrees (by Fabio Paternò), which is also supported by tools that are freely available.

=== For Inclusion ===
Knowing how to do Task Analysis is a fundamental skill in inclusive teaching. In fact, it consists of a backward composition of the objective which leads to the construction of a map (Plan), that is, a sequence of simpler actions and abilities to achieve a specific objective.

For the Task Analysis it is necessary to clearly identify which are the prerequisites for the activity: essential prerequisites (knowledge, skills and competences of the student) and support prerequisites (environmental facilitators). It therefore requires to organize teaching and also an indispensable flexibility.

There are also three approaches: technical (students are passive tools), socio-relational (students are motivated to participate), sociotechnical (an intermediate way in which students are able to make decisions and solve problems).

=== The advantages ===
- Perform a division into sequences.
- Identify the precise moment in which the problem occurs (behavior analysis, systematic observation) and be able to intervene effectively and efficiently.
- Establish a progression of correct and gradual learning objectives.
- Immediately provides for the inclusion of special environmental facilitators.
- Move from the concrete level to the graphic coding of the experience and to metacognition.

== Documentation ==
Since the 1980s, a major change in technical documentation has been to emphasize the tasks performed with a system rather than documenting the system itself. In software documentation particularly, long printed technical manuals that exhaustively describe every function of the software are being replaced by online help organized into tasks. This is part of the new emphasis on usability and user-centered design rather than system/software/product design.

This task orientation in technical documentation began with publishing guidelines issued by IBM in the late 1980s. Later IBM studies led to John Carroll's theory of minimalism in the 1990s.

With the development of XML as a markup language suitable for both print and online documentation (replacing SGML with its focus on print), IBM developed the Darwin Information Typing Architecture XML standard in 2000. Now an OASIS standard, DITA has a strong emphasis on task analysis. Its three basic information types are Task, Concept, and Reference. Tasks are analyzed into steps, with a main goal of identifying steps that are reusable in multiple tasks.

== Types of task analysis ==
There are multiple approaches to task analysis, with two common methods being hierarchical task analysis (below) and sequential task analysis. The choice of task analysis can impact on what conclusions people draw from the analysis.

== Hierarchical task analysis ==
Hierarchical task analysis (HTA) is a task description method and a variant of task analysis. Task description is a necessary precursor for other analysis techniques, including critical path analysis (CPA). HTA is used to produce an exhaustive description of tasks in a hierarchical structure of goals, sub-goals, operations and plans. In HTA, tasks are broken down into progressively smaller units.

=== Operations and plans ===
Operations are the actions performed by people interacting with a system or by the system itself, and plans explain the conditions necessary for these operations. Operations describe the smallest individual task steps in the HTA, i.e. those which cannot be broken down into plans and further operations. They are the individual actions, such as 'visually locate control' or 'move hand to control', which the user must perform in a particular combination to achieve the goal of task completion.

=== Applying ===
The following steps should be followed when conducting a HTA:

1. Define the task under investigation and identify the purpose of the task analysis. The analyst should have some further evaluation methods in mind for which the HTA will be useful and should have reason for needing this type of analysis to be performed.
2. Data collection – In order to carry out the HTA it is necessary to obtain data on how the task is performed. This could be collected via observation of the task in question or from a detailed specification of the device under analysis. Alternatively, interviews or questionnaires with people that have first-hand experience of performing that task could be conducted to gather the necessary detail.
3. Define the overall task goal, which will be presented as the top level in the HTA. An example might be "increase fan speed by two steps". This describes what is being achieved by performing the task; however, at this stage there is no indication of how the task will be performed.
4. Determine the next level of sub-goals by breaking down the overall goal. A sub-goal for the above example might be "open the climate menu". This provides more information about how to accomplish the task; however, it can still be broken down into smaller units, which will describe the individual operations (performed via the visual, manual or cognitive modes) that need to be performed.
5. Continue breaking down the sub-goals until all operations are identified. Operations in the "reduce fan speed task" will include "move finger to climate menu button" and "touch climate menu button".
6. Define plans to describe how to perform the operations in each sub-goal level of the hierarchy. In the fan speed example, the two operations will have to be performed in series, one after the other. The plan will instruct the user to "perform 1, then 2". Operations can also be performed in parallel, and in this case the plan would instruct the user to "perform 1 and 2 together". Numbers should be assigned to the different levels in the hierarchy.

==== Organising the hierarchy ====
Each level in the HTA should be numbered according to its hierarchical level: The overall goal is the highest hierarchical level and should be numbered 0. The first sub-goal in the hierarchy will be 1, also with plan 1. Further levels just extend this system - third hierarchical level: 1.1, fourth hierarchical level: 1.1.1, and so on. A HTA can be represented in list or diagram form. In list form lines should be indented to denote the different hierarchical levels. In diagram form each operation should be placed within a box and links should be made between them: a lower hierarchical level should branch from underneath a higher level operation. Plans should be written next to the branches to describe the way in which the branched operations should be carried out. Hence, the plans should be goal oriented to achieve the success of any field.

=== Applications and limitations ===
HTA is a task description method which is most commonly used as a starting point for further analyses such as multimodal CPA and SHERPA. On its own, HTA does not provide results for usability evaluation; however, you should be able to study the HTA in order to learn about the structure of different tasks. It may also allow you to highlight unnecessary task steps or potential errors that might occur in task performance. HTA is a fairly time-consuming method to carry out as each individual operation in a task needs to be analysed; however, creating a comprehensive HTA can considerably reduce the time required for other modelling methods.

== Safety Critical Task Analysis ==
Safety Critical Task Analysis (SCTA) focuses on how tasks that are critical to major accident risk are performed. SCTA is a crucial assessment designed to predict and understand the role that human error plays in major accidents. This is a type or workshop conducted to support Major Accident Hazard (MAH) industries, such as oil and gas, chemicals. Those activities or tasks that are identified as being safety critical (i.e. may result in significant impact to the environment or harm to people if completed incorrectly), are put through an SCTA which would break down the task into a step-by-step process and review where the most likely points of error are to occur. The aim of this is to identify where additional control measures can be introduced that would reduce the likelihood of human error in completing such an important task.

== Versus work domain analysis ==
If task analysis is likened to a set of instructions on how to navigate from Point A to Point B, then Work domain analysis (WDA) is like having a map of the terrain that includes Point A and Point B. WDA is broader and focuses on the environmental constraints and opportunities for behavior, as in Gibsonian ecological psychology and ecological interface design.

== See also ==
- Business process mapping and business process modeling
- Cognitive ergonomics
- Critical path analysis
- Direct instruction
- Human reliability
- Job analysis
- Programmed instruction
- Staffing models
- Workflow
