= Personnel psychology =

Subfield of industrial and organizational psychology

Personnel psychology is a subfield of industrial and organizational (I-O) psychology . Personnel psychology is the area of I-O psychology that primarily deals with the recruitment, selection and evaluation of personnel, and with other job aspects such as morale, job satisfaction, and relationships between managers and workers in the workplace. It is the field of study that concentrates on the selection and evaluation of employees; this area of psychology deals with job analysis and defines and measures job performance, performance appraisal, employment testing, employment interviews, personnel selection and employee training, and human factors and ergonomics.

== History ==
=== Twentieth Century ===
By the end of the nineteenth century, industrial, or personnel psychology, was developed as a way to understand work behavior. One influential figure in the beginning of this new area was Hugo Munsterberg, a German psychologist who was trained by Wilhelm Wundt and who also worked with William James. Munsterberg studied selection and fit in the workplace, and he proposed experimental methods as solutions to business problems in his text, Psychology and Industrial Efficiency (1913). He also served on the faculty at Harvard, and in his writings, talked about such topics as fit in a career, from both an employer's and employee's perspective. Walter Dill Scott, also trained by Wundt and a professor at Northwestern University, is credited with the foundation of I/O psychology, as he used such psychology in advertising and in founding the first personnel consulting firm.

Our aim is to sketch the outlines of a new science which is to intermediate between the modern laboratory psychology and the problems of economics: the psychological experiment is systematically to be placed at the service of commerce and industry.

— Hugo Munsterberg, Psychology and Industrial Efficiency, p. 3.

=== World War I ===
The time around WW I brought about significant contributions to the field of industrial psychology. Robert Yerkes, along with Walter Van Dyke Bingham and Scott, headed the selection and placement of army personnel with their Army Alpha and Army Beta tests. These test helped to bring attention to testing as a form of selection and their uses in practical applications. This was the beginning of industrial psychology in the real world as opposed to the world of academia.

=== World War II ===
World War II was marked by much of the same needs as in World War I. Bingham and Yeakes helped out the military again in developing research programs designed to assess work behavior, including: the Army General Classification Test (AGCT), the Aircrew Classification Test Battery, assessment center methods, and performance appraisal methods. Post World War II advances were also seen in increased doctoral programs, master's degree programs, and the expansion of other already existing programs.

=== Twenty-first Century ===
As opposed to war defining most of the twentieth century and the use of the applied psychology, economics will be the main focus of the twenty-first century. Technology is ever changing and decreasing the number of jobs for individuals; organizations are also striving to "flatten" out in their attempts to move away from largely hierarchical companies, and one other changing area of the twenty-first century is the diversifying of the workplace. All these applications and areas will help to serve as importance for I/O psychology in the workplace and economic world.

== Uses ==
Personnel psychology is used in a variety of ways. Some of the most important functions it serves range from analyzing corporate culture and individual and group interactions to developing and evaluating employee selection and appraisal techniques. Other areas of use are assessing corporate leadership and employee motivation strategies, identifying causes and resolutions to internal conflicts, advising management of the potential psychological and social impact of corporate policies, and researching ways organizations can effectively manage cultural differences and leadership styles.

Personnel psychologists work in a variety of settings, including education, business, community, and agency environments. Many personnel psychologists serve as human resources specialists, helping organizations with staffing, training, and employee development and management in areas such as strategic planning, quality management, and adjustments to organization changes. Personnel psychologists apply psychological theories and principles to organizations. This field focuses on increasing workplace productivity and related issues such as the physical and mental well-being of employees. Personnel psychologists use psychological measurement and research findings related to human abilities, motivation, perception, and learning in seeking to improve the fit between the needs of the work organization and those of the people who populate it.

=== Job Analysis ===
Job analysis can be defined as "A loose term for the study of particular aspects of a given job. Those aspects may range from the tasks and duties of the position, to an examination of the desirable qualities of an employee, to the conditions of employment including pay, promotion opportunities, vacations, etc.". There are many different ways to conduct a job analysis, as there are many different parts to it: job evaluation, job description, and job specifications. The most common tool used to measure job design is the Job Description Survey or JDS, but there is growing literature for other surveys and measures such as the Work Design Questionnaire or WDQ. Such analyses are used to determine "what is important" within the job description, so as to better educate companies and individuals on the descriptions and requirements of the job.

=== Selection ===
Selection involves the exchange of information between applicants and employers. Personnel selection involves the goal alignment of applicants and organizations, however those goals may not always line up at times. Thus selection processes are designed to ensure that those goals line up and individuals are the best "fit" for the organization. Thus individuals may be likely to adapt their own behavior to better align with an organization. Interviews are one of the most important pieces of information in regards to selection decisions. In the interviews, it is found that individuals are more likely to exhibit organizational citizenship behaviors (OCB) in their hopes of being hired by the company, but it is also found that these OCBs play a positive role in the interviewer's evaluation of the individuals. Today, increases in technology have allowed for a much easier administration of such online tests as measures of aptitude, achievement, and personality. Thus these tests are starting to serve as the first hurdle of the selection process, even more so than the interview.

=== Training ===
Training relates to an organization giving an individual the skills, knowledge, and abilities to help put the individual in line with the organization's goal. Training provides the opportunity for the individual to gain personal, career, and job-related benefits, such as individual increases in job performance, better career relationships and objectives, and pride and job satisfaction. Research has also shown that the effectiveness of training has a relationship in how the work of an individual is organized. Organizations that allow employees more autonomy and freedom in how they do their work have shown that employees are more able to improve and incorporate training aspects into their work.

=== Rewards ===
One major approach to compensation around the world, is performance based pay. Short of job loss, income security is a major stressor for individuals as they stress out over predictability of income. In contrast, other research has also shown though that such pay systems can actual provide motivation, satisfaction, or desired challenge levels to the job, instead of individuals perceiving it is inequality, unfair, or stressful. Stable pay systems have been found to not necessarily be the best link between an individual's performance and his pay level. Stable pay levels can also account for decreases in performance as individuals' incomes are not linked with their performances. Thus these performance levels may drop without a perceived cost to their pay level. It has also been found that individuals who perceive a strong connection between their effort and reward are evaluated more highly and in turn have higher work satisfaction.

=== Feedback ===
Feedback has been defined as any response from the environment that helps to influence future actions, information that follows task performance, or information from others in the social world, whether it be approval or disapproval. A positive feedback culture is one in which individuals not only receive and solicit feedback for job performance improvement, but also use both formal and informal feedback as means to accomplish performance goals. Such an environment is created by an employee's direct supervisors and includes the quality and frequency of coaching and informal feedback delivery. Research has found publicly offering employees negative feedback may decrease positive affect and willingness to show organizational citizenship behaviors, and doing so, also increases tendencies to engage in more destructive forms of work behavior

== See also ==
- Wiley-Blackwell: Personnel Psychology scholarly journal
- Old Dominion University: Industrial / Organizational Psychology university department
- English Articles: Personnel psychology article at englisharticles.info website
- Personnel psychology at "Dr. Dewey's" webpage
- Industrial & organizational assessment
