= Work behavior =

Behavior uses in employment

Work behavior is the behavior one uses in employment and is normally more formal than other types of human behavior. This varies from profession to profession, as some are far more casual than others. For example, a computer programmer would usually have far more leeway in their work behavior than a lawyer.

People are usually more careful than outside work in how they behave around their colleagues, as many actions intended to be in jest can be perceived as inappropriate or even harassment in the work environment. In some cases, men may take considerably more care so as not to be perceived as being sexually harassing than they would ordinarily.

== Counterproductive work behavior ==
Counterproductive work behavior is also a type of work behavior. The majority of people do not know what counterproductive work behavior is. Counterproductive work behavior is the act that employees have against the organizations that do harm or violate the work production. Some examples of Counterproductive work behavior would include passive actions such as not working to meet date line or faking incompetence. Even people do not recognize this behavior, it seems normal to them. Some examples of counterproductive behavior are:

Intimate partner violence: Intimate partner violence occurs more often in the workplace. About 36% to 75% of employed women who experience Intimate partner violence have come out reporting that they have been harassed by a significant other while working. A variety of abusive behaviors is being demonstrated against victims to hinder their ability to come to work, get their work done, and stay in their current employment. The interference that the perpetrators employ are: Stocking them at their work site, harassing the victim, and interfering with the victim's work; for example, sabotaging the victim, so they can not get to work.

Boredom: Jobs that require individuals to do the same task on a daily basis can lead to counterproductive behaviors. Boredom on the job could result in unfavorable work practices such as frequently missing work, lack of concentration, or withdrawal from the task that the person was hired to do, and thus, leading to a decrease in work efficiency.

1. When people or someone ignore their colleagues while at work.
2. When people work slowly and the work needs to be done fast.
3. When people refuse to help their colleagues.
4. When people refuse to accept a task.
5. When people show less interest in their work.
6. When people show destructive behavior against their colleagues.
7. When people do not appreciate their colleague's success.

These are the examples of counterproductive behavior that people confront in their daily life.

A way to counteract this unproductive behavior is to address the principle that work behavior is a function of contingent consequences. By addressing what employees value most in their workplace, boredom on the job can be avoided. Competitive compensation, bonuses and merit-based rewards, retirement plans, supplemental training program and flexible work locations are the top five values that employees value most at their workplace. Recognizing positive and productive behavior at a workplace can be quite simple by using job analysis. This method gives others a better understanding and evaluation of a typical duty they are looking for (see also Industrial & Organizational Assessment).

== Sexual harassment in the workplace ==
Sexual harassment occurs when one individual (whether it's a male or female) takes a sexual interest in the other person while at work and try to exploit them. The act of objectifying the target could lead to the feeling of insecurities, and pressures to leave the company. A researched showed that out of 134,200 people in a studied, 65% of men and 93% of women were harassed sexually in the place of work and that efficiency of work was affected due to job turnover and people calling out sick. The study also showed that sexual harassment could lead to people feeling depressed, result in a high level of anxiety, and mental and physical stress.

== Interactions with colleagues ==
=== Effects of verbal abuse ===
Verbal abuse is a concept that indicates some form of mistreatment via oral expression. Verbal abuse can impact productivity in the workplace, both for the employee and employer. This type of behavior could lead to the resignation of the employee, poor quality of work, turnovers, and illness. Additionally, there is another type of verbal abuse called mobbing. This is when a group of individuals engages in non-physical abusive behavior at work. This could be expressed in aggressive and unprincipled forms of verbal abuse towards one person. If this behavior continues, the person will eventually feel pressured to quit his/her job due to poor performance.

== Conflict resolution at work ==
It is important to resolve any issues that arise at work among team members. Conflict resolution plays a huge role in this. Handling these issues appropriately helps decrease harmful influences of all types of conflicts by bringing back integrity, building success in the work place and restoring efficiency. Working together to resolve conflict resolution lets conflict of different types to be fixed in a way that is beneficial to the group.
