= CTT =

CTT may refer to:

- CTT Correios de Portugal, S.A., the national postal service of Portugal
- CTT (Macau), the Macau Post Office
- Cycling Time Trials, the governing body for time trialling in the UK
- Classical test theory
- Columbia TriStar Television
- ConcurTaskTrees
- Custom Air Transport's ICAO code
- CTT, a specialty certification of Comp TIA
- CTT, a codon for the amino acid Leucine
- × Cattlianthe (Ctt.), a nothogenus of orchids
- CTT, a enlisted rating within the United States Navy, a subset of a Cryptologic technician.
