= Staffing models =

Information used to measure work activity

Staffing models are related sets of reports, charts and graphs that are used to precisely measure work activity, determine how many labor hours are needed, analyze how employee time is spent and calculate costs. Staffing models are used in the healthcare industry and use predictive analytics methods for forecasting.

== Overview ==
Staffing models provide:

- A structure for staff scheduling
- Staff interactions
- Both a broad and in-depth picture of work activity, and its time and cost
- Information about current resource and process performance
- Information and tools to manage and improve staffing resource performance.

Staffing models are also used to reduce overtime costs.

Time presentation curves have been used to guide staffing in the emergency department.

== See also ==
- Job analysis
- Salary inversion
- Task analysis
- Work sampling
