= Individual psychological assessment =

Individual psychological assessment (IPA) is a tool used by organizations to make decisions on employment. IPA allows employers to evaluate and maintain potential candidates for hiring, promotion, and development by using a series of job analysis instruments such as position analysis questionnaires (PAQ), occupational analysis inventory (OAI), and functional job analysis (FJA). These instruments allow the assessor to develop valid measures of intelligence, personality tests, and a range of other factors as means to determine selection and promotion decisions. Personality and cognitive ability are good predictors of performance. Emotional Intelligence helps individuals navigate through challenging organizational and interpersonal encounters. Since individual differences have a long history in explaining human behavior and the different ways in which individuals respond to similar events and circumstances, these factors allow the organization to determine if an applicant has the competence to effectively and successfully do the work that the job requires. These assessments are administered throughout organizations in different forms, but they share one common goal in the selection process, and that is the right candidate for the job.

== Overview ==
In the past, the use of Individual psychological assessment has increased and improved within human resources to evaluate and maintain potential candidates for employment in various levels of position in the workforce. The use of this type of assessment has become defined and set criteria have been developed to test job applicants. By collecting the needed information utilizing the tools listed below, the individual can be assessed as being right for the job at hand.

== Individual factors ==
=== Personality ===
Personality is an individual's relatively stable characteristic patterns of thought, emotion, behavior and the psychological mechanisms that support and drive those patterns. The vast majority of investigations of the personality correlates of performance have used the Big Five taxonomy as the basis of their selection of predictors. The Big Five model (or Five Factor Model) holds that personality comprises five dimensions: Openness to experience, conscientiousness, extroversion, agreeableness and neuroticism. Of the five dimensions, conscientiousness appears to have the strongest relation to overall job performance across a wide variety of jobs.

=== Leadership style ===
Leadership style is the behaviors of leaders, focusing on what leaders do and how they act. The relates to how leaders delegate and communicate with their subordinates. Their leadership style may be one or a combination of a(n); authoritarian leadership, democratic leadership, charismatic leadership and laissez-faire leadership.

=== Cognitive ability ===
Cognitive ability measures should predict performance outcomes in most, if not all, jobs and situations.

=== Emotional Intelligence ===
Emotional intelligence (EI) is the subset of social intelligence that involves the ability to monitor one's own and others’ feelings and emotions, to discriminate among them and to use this information to guide one's thinking and actions. This form of intelligence allows someone to carry out accurate reasoning about emotions and gives them the ability to use emotions and emotional knowledge to enhance thought. Assessing an individual's EI enhances the prediction and understanding of the outcomes of organization members, such as their job performance and their effectiveness as leaders within an organization.

==== Branches ====
There are four dimensions of emotional intelligence:

1. The Perceiving and Expressing Branch - concerns how accurately and how fast individuals can express emotions and identify, detect, and decipher aspects of emotional experiences and emotional displays
2. The Using Emotion Branch - concerns how well individuals capitalize on the systematic effects of emotions on cognitive activities such as creativity and risking
3. The Understanding Branch - concerns how accurately individuals reason about various aspects of emotions, such as when they attach labels to emotions and identify connections between events and emotional reactions
4. The Regulating Emotions Branch - concerns how well individuals can increase, maintain, or decrease the magnitude or duration of their or others’ emotions

== Process ==
Information is collected from an assessor or group of assessors, in person or via other assessment methods. Simulation of exercises related to the job being tested could also be used which takes place in a replicated work setting as the one used on the job. Once all the information is gathered, the assessor(s) presents the information in a special format to the client or organization, grants the participant recommendations based on the assessment and provides feedback to the participant and the organization.

== Validity ==
The validity of IPA depends on variables such as the standardization of the tests and personality factors, however important variables is the accuracy of the assessor's judgement. More research is required regarding the assessor's judgment to help improve the effectiveness of the assessments. The way that scientists have conceptualized validity has changed over the past several decades, as documented in the several versions of the APA Standards (AERA et al. 1999) and SIOP (2003) Principles. The most recent versions of both these documents treat validity as a unitary concept that is supported by a variety of evidence. However, The APA Standards and SIOP Principles has documented validity to be the unitary concept that is supported by a variety of evidence (see issue 4 of the 2009 volume and issue 3 of the 2010 volume of Industrial and Organizational Psychology: Perspectives on Science and Practice, respectively).

== Assessing individuals ==
The final aspect of industrial and organizational assessment is the assessment of individuals. The analysis includes a broad variety of assessment procedures. Many detailed tools help narrow down the method and result of assessment, including psychological testing, biographical information, interviews, work sampling, surveys, assessment centres, onboarding and computer-based assessment.

== Areas of assessment ==
The four main areas of I/O Psychology highlight—Jobs, Work, Performance, and People. Looking at each category gives insight into how Industrial & Organizational Assessment truly works, and what is necessary to complete each step of the process. These four categories can be further broken down.

== Job analysis ==
A Job Analysis is the process through which one gains an understanding of the activities, goals, and requirements demanded by a work assignment. Job analysis constitutes the preceding step of every application of psychology to human resource management including, but not limited to, the development of personnel selection, training, performance evaluation, job design, deployment, and compensation systems.

=== Types of Job analysis ===
==== The Position Analysis Questionnaire ====
The Position Analysis Questionnaire (PAQ) developed by McCormick, Jeanneret, and Mecham (1972) is a structured job analysis instrument to measure job characteristics and relate them to human characteristics. It consists of 195 job elements that represent human behavior involved in work activities”. The items that fall into five categories:

1. Information input (where and how the worker gets information)
2. Mental processes (reasoning and other processes that workers use)
3. Work output (physical activities and tools used on the job)
4. Relationships with other persons
5. Job context (the physical and social contexts of work)

PAQ researchers have aggregated PAQ data for hundreds of jobs; that database are maintained by Purdue University. Many research exists on the PAQ; it has yielded reasonably good reliability estimates and has been linked to several assessment tools”. Job seekers and employers answer questions on form outlining skills, abilities and knowledge needed to perform the job. Responses are calculated and a composite job requirement statement is produced. In a study of the comparative of 4 job analysis methods, PAQ method is structured to allow for easy quantification. The study also indicated it was closest and compatible to receive important information about an applicant The format of this method include in both data collection and computer analysis and can yield results much faster than the other methods. It has been shown to be extremely reliable, results usually replicate on a second administration. Because PAQ is worker oriented, it does not qualify if work is actually getting done on the job. Task differences on the job is not picked up because PAQ primarily focus on behaviors.

==== Occupational Analysis Inventory ====
The Occupational Analysis Inventory (OAI) contains 617 "work elements." It was designed to yield more specific job information than other multi-job questionnaires such as the PAQ while still capturing work requirements for virtually all occupations. The major categories of items are five-fold:

1. Information Received
2. Mental Activities
3. Work Behavior
4. Work Goals
5. Work Context

OAI respondents rate each job element on one of four rating scales: part-of-job, extent, applicability, or a special scale designed for the element. The OAI has been used to gather information on 1,400 jobs selected to represent five major occupational categories. Reliabilities obtained with the OAI have been moderate, somewhat lower than those achieved with the PAQ”.

==== Functional job analysis ====
Job analysis as a management technique was developed around 1900. It became one of the tools by which managers understood and directed organization the website's findings state, “Beginning in the 1940s, functional job analysis (FJA) was used by U.S. Employment Service job analysts to classify jobs for the DOT (Fine & Wiley, 1971). The most recent version of FJA uses seven scales to describe what workers do in jobs:

1. Things
2. Data
3. People
4. Worker Instructions
5. Reasoning
6. Math
7. Language

Each scale has several levels that are anchored with specific behavioral statements and illustrative tasks. Like other job analysis instruments, FJA is a methodology for collecting job information. While it was used for many years as a part of the DOT, the Department of Labor is replacing the DOT with O*NET and will not be using FJA in O*NET. There is no current database of jobs (other than the DOT) containing FJA data for jobs in the national economy”.

== Goal of Individual Assessment Methods ==
Organizations aim to reach their goals, for the goal of individual assessment the most important attribute is to collect as much information from individuals aiming to work in a common company. They are collectivities rather than individuals because achieving the goals requires the efforts (work) of a number of people (workers). The point at which the work and the worker come together is called a job. The company and the Industrial and organization psychologist need to obtain a lot of information. Some of the information they need to find out is:

- What does or should the person do?
- What knowledge, skill, and abilities does it take to perform this job?
- What is the result of the person performing the job?
- How does this job fit in with other jobs in the organization?
- What is the job's contribution toward the organization's goals?

== See also ==
- Industrial and organizational psychology
- Personnel psychology
- Personnel selection
- Personality psychology
- Psychometrics
- Psychological testing
- Differential psychology
- Job analysis
- Position analysis questionnaire
