= PAQ (disambiguation) =

PAQ may refer to:

== Computing and Science ==
- PAQ, a series of lossless data compression archivers
- Paq, a symbol for the mineral Paqueite
- Partition Analysis of Quasispecies

== International codes ==
- PAQ, the International Telecommunication Union's code for Easter Island
- PAQ, an airline code for Pacific Air Express
- PAQ, an airline code for Palmer Municipal Airport

== Questionnaires ==
- Personal Attributes Questionnaire, a personality test
- Perth Alexithymia Questionnaire, a questionnaire to help diagnose emotional blindness
- Position analysis questionnaire, a structured job analysis questionnaire

== Sports ==
- PAQ, the Union Cycliste Internationale team code for POL–Aqua
- PanAm Aquatics
- Pickleball Association of Queensland

== Other ==
- PAQ, a U.S. military acronym for PALACE Acquire
- People against quats, an action group to eliminate the use of antimicrobial consumer products

== See also ==
- iPAQ
