= Bayton (surname) =

Bayton is an English toponymic surname. Notable people with the surname include:

- John Bayton, English cricketer
- Phil Bayton, British cyclist
- James Arthur Bayton, American psychologist
- Ruth Virginia Bayton, American-born entertainer and actress
