= FJA =

FJA may refer to:

- Fiji Link, a Fijian airline
- Functional job analysis
- The Jean and Samuel Frankel Jewish Academy of Metropolitan Detroit
- Fédération des jeunes agriculteurs, a Belgian member of CEJA
