= User analysis =

In systems design, user analysis is the means by which scientists, engineers and technical writers determine the characteristics of users which will influence the development of software systems or other technological products. During the process, developers in technical fields gather information about users of their products through interviews, focus groups and other forms of qualitative research. This is typically performed by forming use cases based upon the actual work flow tasks which the users will perform while using a given piece of technology. Such analyses are vital to the composition of software documentation.

Though very distinct, user analysis is related to task analysis.

== Approach ==
When developing new technology or software, identifying the potential users of a system and their attributes is necessary in order to ensure that said technology or software will be more user friendly.

During this development, the user analysis is the basic research phase which takes place before actual drafting of the technology's technical documentation. In this way, it's typically the first step of the document composition process. Such an analysis is intended to result in tacit knowledge, or a set of facts regarding the users' values, behaviors, knowledge of the documentation and product and motivation for using said documentation and product. Revealing the tacit knowledge of users' activities, as opposed to the simple operations which a given technology can perform, is often referred to as an unspoken but understood trick of the trade for the technical communicators who conduct user analyses.

A good technical communicator will perform a user analysis aimed at finding both what exactly a user needs to do, and what the user would do with the technology in question. Some experts in the field of user analysis have emphasized the importance of understanding the transfer of learning during this process, though the concept itself is a controversial one.

=== Interacting with users ===
User analysis is a process which calls for qualitative research. Because such research usually (though not always) centers around human subjects, the degree of formality and personalness is an issue. In the modern era, users are often reached via virtual communities, which themselves often form around the use of a particular technology.

=== Statistical analysis of usage ===
Besides traditional way to interacting with users, analysis can be done with statistical analysis of the usage of log of users. With artificial techniques like machine learning, tremendous analysis results can be generated in parallel.
