= Employment bond =

Employment contract requiring penalty fee for leaving early

An employment bond is a contract requiring that an employee continue to work for their employer for a specified period, under penalty of a monetary forfeiture to the employer. Such contracts and associated surety bonds are similar to indentured servitude or serfdom, in that although employees are compensated, they are not permitted to leave their employment except under specified conditions. However, in general, the only penalty for breaching the contract is payment of the bond amount.

== Legality ==
=== India ===
The landmark case Toshniwal Brothers (Pvt.) Ltd. vs Eswarprasad, E. and Others, decided in 1996, describes the legality of employment bonds in India. It holds that under the Indian Contract Act, 1872, contracts requiring an employee to pay a bond if they prematurely resign their employment are legal and enforceable, at least in cases where employers pay expenses like training for the employee. The case refers to the 1973 Supreme Court of India case Union of India (Uoi) vs. Rampur Distillery and Chemical Co. Ltd., which held that a surety bond in favour of the Government of India securing the delivery of some rum was unenforceable because the government did not show an actual loss, among other cases, to limit the forfeiture of bond to cases where the employer has suffered some cognizable loss. A related case from 1995 in the Madras High Court, P. Nagarajan vs. Southern Structurals Ltd., corroborated the limitation of damages payable to the loss actually suffered even in spite of a liquidated damages stipulation. The employee cannot be ordered by the court to return to service for their previous employer after leaving; they can only be found to forfeit the bond.

=== Poland ===
Article 65 of Polish Constitution establishes a principle of freedom of work, which includes freedom to terminate employment relationship and prohibition of compulsory work. In consequence Polish Labor Code also prohibits to limit by any means employees statutory right to terminate the employment agreement. In Poland termination notice periods are defined by Labor Code and shall not be modified by parties' stipulations in the employment contract. In particular it is prohibited to introduce financial penalties for terminating the employment contract. There is one exception provided in article 103(5) of Polish Labor Code that allows by means of special training contract to impose on the employee an obligation to work for the particular employer for the period not exceeding 3 years. This is allowed only when the employer invests in training or education of the employee. In the event of early termination by the employee, the employer may demand payment of compensation that shall be decreased proportionally to the period that remains until the end of the agreed period of work commitment.

=== United States ===
Demands for specific performance in personal services contracts (i.e. to remain in employment) are generally unenforceable under the Thirteenth Amendment to the United States Constitution. However, whether damages can become payable under these contracts varies by industry and industry-specific circumstances. For example, in the music industry, an agreement to work for a specific record label may be enforceable and result in the awarding of damages; though this is not often an employment agreement, it is a personal services agreement and specific performance is unavailable as a remedy due to the Thirteenth Amendment.

=== Training Repayment Agreement Provisions ===
An investigation in 2023 found that TRAP clauses (that is, training-repayment-agreement provisions), which stipulate that the cost of on-the-job training will be borne by the employee, have become much more common in the United States than they were in previous decades. Employees are made to pay a fee for leaving sooner than agreed, nominally to recoup the employer's training and recruiting costs, although in some cases the fees have been challenged as being punitively high. In July 2024, the IT staffing agency Smoothstack was sued by the United States Department of Labor for its use of TRAP agreements described as "modern-day indentured servitude." Even when unenforcable, TRAP contracts can have a chilling effect.
