= Position analysis questionnaire =

Position analysis questionnaire (PAQ) is a structured job analysis questionnaire that evaluates the skill level and basic characteristics required of workers to successfully execute the tasks, duties, and responsibilities of a job. The PAQ was developed at Purdue University by McCormick, E.J., & Jeanneret, and Mecham in 1969. The PAQ method involves a series of detailed questioning to produce many analysis reports. This method is widely used within industrial and organizational psychology, individual psychological assessment and human resource departments, and can be easily administered by any individual trained in job analysis.

== Purpose ==
Positional Analysis Questionnaire was developed with the hope that it could be used with a minimum of training on the part of the individual analyzing a job. Compared to many other methods in job analysis, PAQ has been found to be effective, inexpensive, and easy to use for human resource and trainees. Its purpose is to define the duties and responsibilities of a position in order to determine the appropriateness of the position classification, essential functions and/or whether or not the position is exempt from overtime. PAQ contains 195 items called "job elements" and consists of six different divisions:

1. Information input
2. Mental processes
3. Work Output
4. Relationship with other people
5. Job context
6. Job related variables

== Advantages and disadvantages ==
Position analysis questionnaire is inexpensive and takes little time to conduct. It is one of the most standardized job analysis methods, it has various levels of reliability, and its position can be compared through computer analysis. PAQ elements apply to a various number of jobs across the board, as diverged with job assignments. Position analysis questionnaires can be used for individuals repairing automobile generators, serving food to patrons in a restaurant, taking samples of blood from patients, or with worker characteristics such as general learning ability, verbal aptitude, numerical aptitude, manual dexterity, stamina, and reaction time. PAQ uses simple wording and less complex questions than more in-depth job analysis methods. Research has shown PAQ to be an easy and effective method for human resource and other departments in the hiring process. In 1975 Ekkehart Frieling criticized PAQ, stating it is not possible to use one method to differentiate and classify equally all conceivable occupations. Other criticisms state that the PAQ was written at the college level while the incumbents had the education of 10th to 12th grade level, and that PAQ was developed for all jobs but has been demonstrated as limited to 195 jobs and six dimensions.

== Revision ==
The three basic steps to conduct a position analysis questionnaire are:

1. Human resources and other staff attend a PAQ job analysis training course. PAQ questionnaires are filled out by trained professionals, not job incumbents.
2. Trained PAQ job analysts then use the position analysis questionnaire to analyze selected jobs.
3. The PAQ questionnaires are submitted to PAQ for scoring, with the results then used to analyze by human resource or other trained managers.

Patrick and Moore have revised the PAQ and developed a couple of changes called Job Structure Profile (JSP). JSP included item content style and new items to increase the discriminatory of the decision making dimension. This method is designed to be used more by job analysts than by job incumbents. Another alternative to the position analysis questionnaire, the Job Element Inventory (JEI), was developed by Cornelius and Hackel in 1978. It is very similar to the traditional PAQ, but is constructed to be easier to read for incumbents, job analysts and applicants.

Similarly the Work Profiling System took inspiration from the PAQ when it was designed by SHL
