= Employer registration =

Employer registration is the process by which a person or legal entity registers their intent to employ someone.

== Types of employers ==
Employers can fall into one of two categories, people or groups who run a business and people who employ household workers.

People or legal entities who employ workers can include:

- Sole proprietors
- Partnerships
- Corporations, associations and trusts
- Nonprofit and charitable estates
- Organizations and joint ventures
- Limited liability companies.

People who employ household workers can include:

- Private households
- Local chapters of college
- Local college clubs
- Fraternities or sororities

== Registration in various countries ==
In the United Kingdom all employers, including self-employed persons, must register with HM Revenue and Customs. In New Zealand, registration is made to the Inland Revenue. In the United States, employers apply to the Internal Revenue Service to receive an Employer Identification Number.
