= James Arthur Bayton =

American psychologist (1912–1990)

- Born: April 5, 1912; White Stone, Virginia, U.S.
- Died: August, 1990

James Arthur Bayton (April 5, 1912 – August 1990) was an American psychologist. He conducted research in areas of personality, race, social issues, and consumer psychology.

== Early life and education ==
James Arthur Bayton was born on April 5, 1912, in White stone, Virginia to George and Helen Bayton. His father, a physician, had graduated from the medical school at Howard University. Bayton graduated from Temple University's high school in 1931 and subsequently matriculated at Howard University as a Chemistry major. Bayton began his undergraduate career planning to go into medicine, however, taking psychology courses taught by Francis Sumner, Max Meenes, and Frederick Watts sparked Bayton's interest in the behavioral sciences. During his undergraduate career, Bayton was a member of the Omega Psi Phi fraternity. Bayton graduated from Howard in 1935 with a B.A in psychology and began his M.S. studies at Howard. After graduating from the M.S. program, Bayton began further graduate study at Columbia University, where he was taught by R. S. Woodworth and A. T. Poffenberger. When Bayton's father died, Bayton moved back to Philadelphia in order to be closer to his family. He transferred to the University of Pennsylvania and continued his graduate studies under psychologists such as L. Witmer, S. W. Fernberger, M. G. Preston, and M. Viteles. While conducting his doctorate studies, Bayton was offered a teaching position at Virginia State College. Partly due to the financial devastation of the Great Depression, Bayton delayed his graduate studies and became an associate professor of psychology from 1939 to 1943. During this time he published several papers, and was finally awarded his Ph.D. in psychology in 1943.

== Career ==
From 1943 to 1945, during World War II, Bayton worked as a social service analyst for the U.S. Department of Agriculture. Afterward, he became a professor of psychology at Southern University in Louisiana. He taught at Morgan State College in Maryland in 1946 and returned to Howard University as a professor in 1947, where he worked for the remainder of his life. He was the head of the Psychology Department from 1966 to 1970, as well as a graduate research professor from 1982 to 1988. From 1948 to 1953, Bayton also worked part-time in the U.S. Department of Agriculture conducting research on consumer behavior. While working at the USDA, Bayton headed a psychological research program focused on policy development and program evaluation, as well as survey programs.

While working as a professor at Howard, Bayton also served as the vice president of National Analysts, Inc. from 1953 to 1962 and 1966–1967, the vice president of Universal Marketing Research, Inc. from 1962 to 1966, a senior fellow at the Brookings Institution from 1967 to 1968, and a staff psychologist at Chilton Research Services from 1968 to 1976. Working in these positions, he contributed to over 70 corporate sponsored projects. He conducted survey and marking research and focused his work on consumer psychology. He conducted research for Dupont, IMB, Armstrong Cork, Chrysler, Eli Lilly, Curtis Publishing, Johnson and Johnson, Schick, Pet Milk, American Dairy Association, Federal Reserve Board, Smith Kline, Rench, Procter & Gamble, and the Office of Naval Research. He also was a member of the Research Advisory Committee, Social Security Administration, the United States Department of Health Education and Welfare, and the Advisory Committee on Agricultural Science in theDepartment of Agriculture. He was also the chairman of a committee designed to evaluate equal employment opportunity policies in the National Aeronautics and Space Administration.

Bayton was an expert witness for the National Association for the Advancement of Colored People (NAACP) in several cases of school desegregation and job discrimination. He also served as an expert witness for the NAACP Legal Defense Fund. He played an important role in cases of the desegregation of Arlington and Roanoke schools after the "massive resistance" to desegregation headed by U.S. Senator Harry F. Byrd, Sr. He also led desegregation sessions for government agriculture extension systems. Continuing in this line of work, Bayton assessed urban police complaint boards, summer youth programs, community relations, and civil rights commissions in relational to desegregation policies. Throughout his career, Bayton directed over 50 government-sponsored projects. Bayton was a fellow of the American Psychological Association, the American Marketing Association, and the National Academy of Public Administration.

== Honors and awards ==
=== Undergraduate ===
- Elected to Phi Beta Kappa and Sigma Xi honor societies

=== Graduate ===
- Harrison Scholar

=== Professional ===
- Superior Service Award for work at the USDA
- Alpha Kappa Psi Award for paper in the Journal of Marketing that made the greatest contribution to marketing research (1950)
- Outstanding Contribution Award from the District of Columbia Chapter of the American Psychological Foundation (1952)
- Distinguished Teaching Award of the American Psychological Foundation (1981)

== Selected publications ==
Bayton addressed overlap in issues of race and class in his 1956 study, "Race-Class Stereotypes." 92 White and 180 Black college students were asked to choose five adjectives, from a list of 85 words, that described "upper-class white Americans", "upper-class Negroes", "lower class white Americans", and "lower-class Negroes" respectively. Generally, the upper-class was characterized as "intelligent, ambitious, industrious, neat, and progressive", while the lower-class was considered to be "ignorant, lazy, loud, and physically dirty." The only race difference noted was that White subjects characterized Blacks as musical and ostentatious regardless of class. Overall, the assignment of stereotypes varied more due to class than race. In other words, there were more differences between upper-class and lower class stereotypes than stereotypes between different races of the same class. Bayton suggested race differences in stereotyping tasks were partially the product of assumed class differences.

In another study conducted by Bayton regarding race and class, 80 Black and 74 White college students were asked to assign traits (chosen from a list of 80 adjectives) to describe the Black lower class, the Black middle class, the White lower class, and the White middle class. The students were asked to choose five or fewer traits for each group and rate the traits on a scale from -5 to +5. Both Whites and Blacks assigned more advantageous traits to the middle as opposed to the lower class (though the effect was larger for White subjects).

In his study, "Negro perception of Negro and white personality traits," Bayton had the Guilford-Zimmermann Temperament Survey administered to 240 Black students at Howard University. The subjects were prompted to answer in the way that they thought the "average Negro male", "average Negro female", "average White male", or "average White female" would respond. The survey addressed aspects of temperament such as emotional stability, thoughtfulness, and sociability. The results indicated better personality adjustment when the participants were asked to answer as if they were White. Bayton theorized that this tendency to associate positive temperament with Whites may have resulted from an inclination to "idealize the aggressor" and "incorporate his negative views" towards views of the minority group.

Bayton was prominent amongst the psychologists of his time in his efforts to advance minority group participation in professional psychology. In his article, "Minority groups and careers in psychology" he reported on the National Institute of Mental Health conference in 1969. The major topic discussed at this conference was the issue of how to produce more Black and minority Ph.D.s in psychology. Bayton addressed the need for an increased number of minority psychologists in the field in order to develop psychological programs focused on the needs of minority groups. He also referenced the importance of equal opportunity in the field. He reviewed the obstacles to increasing the number of minority psychologists in the field, such as the perception amongst students that psychology is a risky or nontraditional route for a minority member to pursue professionally. He claimed that these students had to be shown that possibilities exist in psychology for minority students, perhaps through the use of brochures or films to be circulated at various institutions. While graduate programs were attempting to recruit Black students in psychology, Bayton suggested that undergraduate psychology programs needed to increase their efforts to attract Black students to the field. He also addressed the issue of quality of education and lack of resources at primarily black institutions. Bayton suggested an attempt to gain federal and private funding for black students at predominately black colleges in order to ensure competent faculty and adequate resources. He proposed requesting funding to create summer programs for undergraduates that could aid in exposure to psychology for minority students at schools lacking psychology programs. He also emphasized the need to continue holding conferences of this nature in the future.

In another paper, "Reflections and Suggestions for Further Study Concerning the Higher Education of Negroes," Bayton reported on another conference that took place in April, 1967. He addressed similar issues regarding how to improve the state of affairs for Black students in higher education.

Throughout his career, Bayton conducted significant research in the area of consumer behavior. His paper, "Motivation, Cognition, Learning—Basic Factors in Consumer Behavior," drew attention to the role of psychological theories as lenses for research in consumer behavior. While he acknowledged that marketing at the time addressed psychological theories of motivation, he claimed that theories of cognition and learning were neglected in consumer behavior research. Bayton explained the importance of cognitive processes in consumer behavior, for one, by explaining what determines whether or not we remember a particular product. In addressing theories of learning, Bayton outlined the role of reinforcement in determining whether a consumer will purchase a good repeatedly and explained the formation of consumer habits as a lessening of conscious decision-making while making a purchase.

Other research contributions made by Bayton pertained to sex differences in decision making, issues of race in military settings, Blacks' decision making in dialysis, Black attitudes regarding kidney transplantation, and Blacks' blood donation and organ and tissue transplantation.

== Legacy ==
Bayton's research interests were widespread. He furthered psychological research in areas of personality, race, social issues, and consumer psychology. His research was generally of an applied nature, and thus, his efforts helped increase the scope and depth of applied work in the field of psychology. In particular, several studies conducted by Bayton foreshadowed the emergence of system-justification theory, which addresses the tendency to support the status-quo or the "system," even when the "system" may not be beneficial to an individual or group. In particular, the idea of out-group favoritism (a subset of system-justification theory), or viewing a high-status group positively and one's own low-status group more negatively, emerges in Bayton's research. In his study, "Negro perception of Negro and white personality traits," he found that Black participants perceived Whites as having more positive temperaments than Blacks. He theorized that this bias resulted from a tendency to "idealize the aggressor" and "incorporate his negative views" into participants' views of their minority group. In other words, out-group favoritism emerged in this study, and the participants appeared to support a racial hierarchy, or "system," that was not beneficial to these subjects. Additionally, in another of Bayton's studies, "Evaluative Race-Class Stereotypes by Race and Perceived Class of Subjects," subjects assigned more advantageous traits to the middle as opposed to the lower class regardless of their own class. This study also illustrates a tendency for people to justify the "system", or in other words, support the American ideal of a social meritocracy whether or not this "system" is truly just or beneficial to them.

Additionally, Bayton made important efforts throughout his career to increase the number of minorities in psychology and improve educational opportunities for Black people.

According to Sherman Ross and Leslie H. Hicks of Howard University, Bayton was "always responsive to students and colleagues" and was "never too busy or uninterested." They also described him as a "model professor and researcher."

== Publications ==
- Ph.D. thesis "Interrelations between levels of aspiration, performance, and estimates of past performances"

=== Journal of Farm Economics ===
- "Discussion: New Techniques in Consumer Preference Research"
- "Contributions of Psychology to the Microeconomic Analysis of Consumer Demand for Food"

=== Journal of Applied Psychology ===
- "Men and women executives and processes related to decision accuracy"
- "Self-concept and Blacks' assessment of Black leading roles in motion pictures and television"
- "Method of single stimulus determinations of taste preferences"
- "Comparative and single stimulus methods in determining taste preferences"

=== Journal of Marketing ===
- "Motivation, Cognition, Learning: Basic Factors in Consumer Behavior"

=== The Journal of Negro Education ===
- "An Exploratory Study of the Role of the Negro Press"
- "The Guidance Dilemma: With Special Reference to the Guidance of Negro Youth"
- "Race-Class Stereotypes"
- "Book Review: Desegregation Resistance and Readiness"
- "The Psychology of Racial Morale"
- "Reflections and Suggestions for Further Study Concerning the Higher Education of Negroes"
- "Racio-National Stereotypes Held by Negroes"
- "Book Review: The Education of Black Philadelphia"
- "Personality Needs, Social Status, and Preferences for an "Ideal Woman" in Black and White College Males"

=== Growth & Change ===
- "Research is the Answer"

=== Journal of Research in Personality ===
- "Validity of Adler's active-constructive, active-destructive, passive-constructive, and passive-destructive typology"

=== Journal of Psychology ===
- "Categories of Attitudes Toward Behavior and the Attitude-Behavior Relationship"
- "Correlations Between Levels of Aspiration"
- "Personality and Prejudice"
- "Persons, Situations, Subjective Expected Utilities, and Assertive Behavioral Intentions"

=== Journal of Consulting and Clinical Psychology ===
- "Validity of two scoring systems for measuring cognitive development with the Rorschach"

=== Journal of General Psychology ===
- "Duration of Success Background and the Effect of Failure Upon Performance"

=== Journal of Abnormal and Social Psychology ===
- "Personality dynamics during success-failure sequences"

=== Journal of Personality and Social Psychology ===
- "Evaluative Race—Class Stereotypes by Race and Perceived Class of Subjects"
- "Negro perception of Negro and white personality traits"

=== American Psychologist ===
- "Minority Groups and Careers in Psychology"
- "Francis Sumner, Max Meenes, and the training of Black psychologists"
- "Opportunities for Negroes in psychology"

== Books ==
- (1941 and 1945?) Differential effect of a social variable upon three levels of aspiration
- (1942 and 1945?) The psychology of racial morale
- (1950) Citrus preferences among customers of select stores
- (1954) Changing patterns of milk consumption in Memphis, Tenn.
- (1954) Preferences for canned orange juices that vary in Brix-acid ratio
- (1955) Perspective on motivation research in marketing
- (1955) The market for food in selected public and private institutions
- (1967) Consumer acceptance of Hawaiian (Kona) coffee
- (1969) Tension in the cities; three programs for survival
- (1972) Transformation of scientists and engineers into managers
- (1977) Aspects of Predisposition to Assertiveness, Resistance to Assertiveness and Insight into Assertiveness Based Upon Race and Sex
- (1986) Improving new technology reporting : guidelines to mobilize NASA technical monitors
