= Custom Air Transport =

American cargo airline

IATA	ICAO	Call sign
5R	CTT	CATT
- Founded: March 1995; 31 years ago
- Commenced operations: December 9, 1995; 30 years ago
- Ceased operations: April 26, 2012; 14 years ago
- Fleet size: 17
- Destinations: 3
- Headquarters: Dania, Florida USA
- Key people: Anthony Romeo CEO
- Website: http://www.customairtransport.net/

Custom Air Transport was a cargo airline based in Fort Lauderdale, Florida, USA which began service on December 9, 1995.

== History ==
The airline was established in March 1995 and began operations in December 1995. It was wholly owned by Anthony Romeo, who was also the chairman and chief executive. CAT operated cargo flights on behalf of Emery Worldwide to and from its hub in Dayton, Ohio until Emery's parent company CF Transportation split the air freight activities into its own division, Menlo Forwarding, which took over the contract with CAT. In 2005, UPS acquired Menlo Forwarding and shut down the Dayton hub. CAT's last flight for Menlo Forwarding was on June 30, 2006, when the Dayton hub was officially closed and all but a few CAT pilots and flight engineers were furloughed. CAT performed some flights in the Caribbean, Central America, and South America. On April 26, 2012 CAT delivered its remaining Boeing 727 to Aeronaves Peruanas Air cargo and ceased all activity.

== Destinations ==
Custom Air Transport operated the following services (at January 2005):

- Domestic scheduled destinations: Chicago and Dayton.
- International scheduled destinations: Mexico City.

== Fleet ==
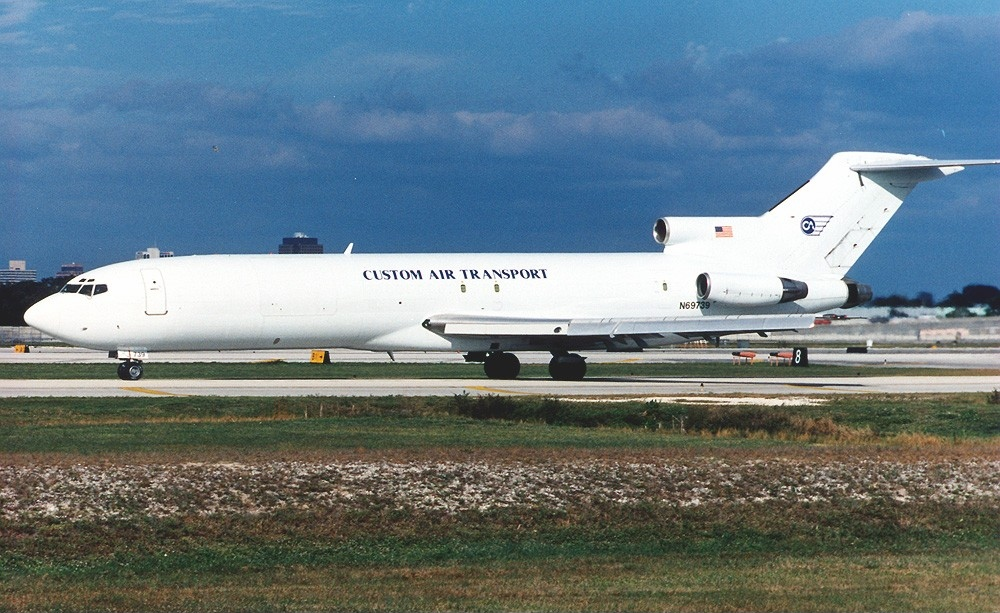
A Custom Air Transport Boeing 727-200F at Fort Lauderdale in 1996

The Custom Air Transport fleet consisted of the following aircraft (as of March 2007):

Aircraft	In fleet	Orders	Notes
Boeing 727-200F	8	0	

== See also ==
- List of defunct airlines of the United States
