= Selection ratio =

Selection ratio is a human resources term that refers to the ratio of the number of job positions to the number of job applicants and is used in the context of selection and recruitment. It is typically assumed to be a number between 0 and 1 where a number closer to zero implies that there are many applicants for any one position.

== Overview ==
The selection ratio provides information about the value of assessment tools, such as interviews, work samples, and psychometric tests. When the selection ratio is close to one, most applicants will need to be hired in order to fill the available positions. As such knowing that one applicant is likely to perform better than another is of limited value.

In contrast when the selection ratio is closer to zero, assessment tools have greater value in indicating which subset of job applicants are likely to perform best. Estimates of the selection ratio can form part of estimates of utility for a given selection and recruitment system.
