= Functional job analysis =

Functional job analysis (FJA) is a method of job analysis that was developed by the Employment and Training Administration of the United States Department of Labor. FJA produces standardized occupational information specific to the performance of the work and the performer.

Quantitative approach to job analysis that utilizes a compiled inventory of the various functions or work activities that can make up any job and that assumes that each job involves three broad worker functions: 1) data 2) people 3) things.

The most recent version of FJA uses seven scales to describe what workers do in jobs: (1) Things, (2) Data, (3) People, (4) Worker Instructions, (5) Reasoning, (6) Math, and (7) Language.
