= Work sampling =

Statistical tenchnique for analyzing work

Work sampling is the statistical technique used for determining the proportion of time spent by workers in various defined categories of activity (e.g. setting up a machine, assembling two parts, idle...etc.). It is as important as all other statistical techniques because it permits quick analysis, recognition, and enhancement of job responsibilities, tasks, performance competencies, and organizational work flows. Other names used for it are 'activity sampling', 'occurrence sampling', and 'ratio delay study'.

In a work sampling study, a large number of observations are made of the workers over an extended period of time. For statistical accuracy, the observations must be taken at random times during the period of study, and the period must be representative of the types of activities performed by the subjects.

One important usage of the work sampling technique is the determination of the standard time for a manual manufacturing task. Similar techniques for calculating the standard time are time study, standard data, and predetermined motion time systems.

== Characteristics of work sampling study ==
The study of work sampling has some general characteristics related to the work condition:

- One of them is the sufficient time available to perform the study. A work sampling study usually requires a substantial period of time to complete. There must be enough time available (several weeks or more) to conduct the study.
- Another characteristic is multiple workers. Work sampling is commonly used to study the activities of multiple workers rather than one worker.
- The third characteristic is long cycle time. The job covered in the study has relatively a long cycle time.
- The last condition is the non-repetitive work cycles. The work is not highly repetitive. The jobs consist of various tasks rather than a single repetitive task. However, it must be possible to classify the work activities into a distinct number of categories.

== Steps in conducting a work sampling study ==
There are several recommended steps when starting to prepare a work sampling study:

1. Define the manufacturing tasks for which the standard time is to be determined.
2. Define the task elements. These are the defined broken-down steps of the task that will be observed during the study. Since a worker is going to be observed, additional categories will likely be included as well, such as "idle", "waiting for work", and "absent".
3. Design the study. This includes designing the forms that will be used to record the observations, determining how many observations will be required, deciding on the number of days or shifts to be included in the study, scheduling the observations, and finally determining the number of observers needed.
4. Identify the observers who will do the sampling.
5. Start the study. All those who are affected by the study should be informed about it.
6. Make random visits to the plant and collect the observations.
7. After completing the study, analyze and present the results. This is done by preparing a report that summarizes and analyzes all data and making recommendations when required.

== Determining the number of observations needed in work sampling ==
After the work elements are defined, the number of observations for the desired accuracy at the desired confidence level must be determined. The formula used in this method is:

$\sigma_P=\sqrt{\frac{pq}{n}}$

$n=\frac{pq}{{\sigma_P}^2}$

$\sigma_P=$ standard error of proportion

$p=$ percentage of working time

$q=$ percentage of idle time

$n=$ number of observations

== Additional applications of work sampling ==
Work sampling was initially developed for determining time allocation among workers' tasks in manufacturing environments. However, the technique has also been applied more broadly to examine work in a number of different environments, such as healthcare and construction. More recently, in the academic fields of organizational psychology and organizational behaviour, the basic technique has been developed into a detailed job analysis method for examining a range of different research questions.

== See also ==
- Sampling (statistics)
- Profiling (computer programming) can be done by work sampling a computer program.
- Staffing models
