= Morris Viteles =

American organizational psychologist (1898-1996)

Morris Simon Viteles (March 21, 1898 - December 7, 1996) was an influential researcher and writer in the field of industrial and organizational psychology. His book Industrial Psychology, published in 1932, was the first comprehensive modern textbook in the field. His writings were so influential that he was often regarded as the founder of the field, although he disavowed that claim.

== Early life and education ==
Viteles was born in a village in the Bessarabian region of the Russian Empire in 1898. His parents moved to England when he was an infant, and in 1904, the family moved to the United States.

Viteles graduated from high school in Philadelphia at the age of 16. He enrolled at the Philadelphia School of Pedagogy, initially determined to become a history teacher. However, within a year he had resolved on a career in psychology.

Viteles completed his bachelor's, master's, and doctoral degrees at the University of Pennsylvania in psychology in 1918, 1919, and 1921, respectively.

== Career ==
In 1921, Viteles' academic career began when he set up the world's first vocational guidance center at the University of Pennsylvania, under the direction of his doctoral adviser Lightner Witmer. In 1922, Viteles was one of the first to use the technique of job analysis, which he used to select employees for a trolley car company. He subsequently assisted Philadelphia Electric in measuring the propensity for error of electrical substation operators, to great success. The company then hired him to pioneer in the utility industry standardized testing for promotion instead of seniority.

Viteles' 1953 book, Motivation and Morale in Industry, supplemented his seminal 1932 textbook Industrial Psychology by addressing the organizational side of the field. Both works were sometimes known as the "Bible" of their respective fields.

In 1963, Viteles took the position of Dean of the University of Pennsylvania Graduate School of Education. In 1968, Viteles retired from the deanship, and from the University of Pennsylvania.

Following his retirement, Viteles received numerous accolades, including an honorary degree from the University of Pennsylvania. In 1988, Viteles received the Psychological Professional Gold Medal Award from the American Psychological Association.

Throughout his career, Viteles took consulting work with large firms, in addition to his teaching and research. He is consequently regarded as an early example of the practitioner–scholar model.

Viteles was also known for the strongly international perspective he brought to the field, building connections with psychologists in numerous European countries. He served as president of the International Association of Applied Psychology from 1958 until his 1968 retirement.
