= Salary inversion =

Salary inversion refers to situations in which the starting salaries for new recruits to an organization increase faster than those for existing employees, and consequently junior employees out-earn their senior colleagues. It typically happens in areas where the demand for suitably qualified professionals exceeds the supply of such professionals in the market. For example, the information technology (IT) industry in recent years has experienced this phenomenon. Salary inversion is also common amongst university faculty in certain fields in which the global demand for qualified academics is increasing rapidly. Here, salary inversion occurs when universities lack the resources to raise existing professors' salaries while continuing to hire new faculty, and may legally constitute a form age discrimination.
