= ConcurTaskTrees =

ConcurTaskTrees (CTT) is a notation for task model specifications used in the design of interactive applications, particularly within model-based user interface design.

The main features of CTT are:

- Hierarchical structure, which provides a large range of granularity in describing large and small task structures;
- Graphical syntax, which reflects the logical structure in a tree-like form;
- Concurrent notation, enabling flexible task ordering.

In the field of human–computer interaction, task models describe the logical activities an application should support to help users achieve their goals. Methods have been developed to derive user interfaces for different platforms from CTT specifications. The last evolution has been the introduction of preconditions.

CTT has been applied in both academia and industry, particularly in domains such as enterprise resource planning (ERP) and safety-critical systems, including air traffic control. It has also been considered by the World Wide Web Consortium (W3C) for task model standardization.

Usability studies have been conducted on CTT, and it has been mapped into the Unified Modeling Language (UML).

== Tool support ==
The editing and analysis of task models is supported by the ConcurTaskTrees Environment (CTTE). The executable code is publicly available and free to download.
