= Job analysis =

Procedures to identify content of a job activities, attributes or requirements to perform

Job analysis (also known as work analysis) is a family of procedures to identify the content of a job in terms of the activities it involves in addition to the attributes or requirements necessary to perform those activities. Job analysis provides information to organizations that helps them determine which employees are best fit for specific jobs.

The process of job analysis involves the analyst gathering information about the duties of the incumbent, the nature and conditions of the work, and some basic qualifications. After this, the job analyst has completed a form called a job psychograph, which displays the mental requirements of the job. The measure of a sound job analysis is a valid task list. This list contains the functional or duty areas of a position, the related tasks, and the basic training recommendations. Subject matter experts (incumbents) and supervisors for the position being analyzed need to validate this final list in order to validate the job analysis.

Job analysis is crucial for first, helping individuals develop their careers, and also for helping organizations develop their employees in order to maximize talent. The outcomes of job analysis are key influences in designing learning, developing performance interventions, and improving processes. The application of job analysis techniques makes the implicit assumption that information about a job as it presently exists may be used to develop programs to recruit, select, train, and appraise people for the job as it will exist in the future.

Job analysts are typically industrial-organizational (I-O) psychologists or human resource officers who have been trained by, and are acting under the supervision of an I-O psychologist. One of the first I-O psychologists to introduce job analysis was Morris Viteles. In 1922, he used job analysis in order to select employees for a trolley car company. Viteles' techniques could then be applied to any other area of employment using the same process.

Job analysis was also conceptualized by two of the founders of I-O psychology, Frederick Winslow Taylor and Lillian Moller Gilbreth in the early 20th century.[1] Since then, experts have presented many different systems to accomplish job analysis that have become increasingly detailed over the decades. However, evidence shows that the root purpose of job analysis, understanding the behavioral requirements of work, has not changed in over 85 years.

== Purpose ==
One of the main purposes of conducting job analysis is to prepare job descriptions and job specifications which in turn helps hire the right quality of workforce into an organization. The general purpose of job analysis is to document the requirements of a job and the work performed. Job and task analysis is performed as a basis for later improvements, including: definition of a job domain; description of a job; development of performance appraisals, personnel selection, selection systems, promotion criteria, training needs assessment, legal defense of selection processes, and compensation plans. The human performance improvement industry uses job analysis to make sure training and development activities are focused and effective. In the fields of human resources (HR) and industrial psychology, job analysis is often used to gather information for use in personnel selection, training, classification, and/or compensation.

Industrial psychologists use job analysis to determine the physical requirements of a job to determine whether an individual who has suffered some diminished capacity is capable of performing the job with, or without, some accommodation. Edwin Flieshman, Ph.D. is credited with determining the underlying factors of human physical fitness. Professionals developing certification exams use job analysis (often called something slightly different, such as "task analysis" or "work analysis") to determine the elements of the domain which must be sampled in order to create a content valid exam. When a job analysis is conducted for the purpose of valuing the job (i.e., determining the appropriate compensation for incumbents) this is called "job evaluation."

Job analysis aims to answer questions such as:

- Why does the job exist?
- What physical and mental activities does the worker undertake?
- When is the job to be performed?
- Where is the job to be performed?
- Under What conditions it is to be performed?

== Procedures ==
As stated before, the purpose of job analysis is to combine the task demands of a job with our knowledge of human attributes and produce a theory of behavior for the job in question. There are two ways to approach building that theory, meaning there are two different approaches to job analysis.

=== Task-oriented ===
Task-oriented procedures focus on the actual activities involved in performing work. This procedure takes into consideration work duties, responsibilities, and functions. The job analyst then develops task statements which clearly state the tasks that are performed with great detail. After creating task statements, job analysts rate the tasks on scales indicating importance, difficulty, frequency, and consequences of error. Based on these ratings, a greater sense of understanding of a job can be attained. Task analysis, such as cognitively oriented task analysis (COTA), are techniques used to describe job expertise. For example, the job analysts may tour the job site and observe workers performing their jobs. During the tour the analyst may collect materials that directly or indirectly indicate required skills (duty statements, instructions, safety manuals, quality charts, etc.).

Functional job analysis (FJA) is a classic example of a task-oriented technique. Developed by Fine and Cronshaw in 1944, work elements are scored in terms of relatedness to data (0–6), people (0–8), and things (0–6), with lower scores representing greater complexity. Incumbents, considered subject matter experts (SMEs), are relied upon, usually in a panel, to report elements of their work to the job analyst. Using incumbent reports, the analyst uses Fine's terminology to compile statements reflecting the work being performed in terms of data, people, and things. The Dictionary of Occupational Titles uses elements of the FJA in defining jobs.

=== Worker-oriented ===
Worker-oriented procedures aim to examine the human attributes needed to perform the job successfully. These human attributes have been commonly classified into four categories: knowledge, skills, abilities, and other characteristics (KSAO). Knowledge is the information people need in order to perform the job. Skills are the proficiencies needed to perform each task. Abilities are the attributes that are relatively stable over time. Other characteristics are all other attributes, usually personality factors. The KSAOs required for a job are inferred from the most frequently-occurring, important tasks. In a worker-oriented job analysis, the skills are inferred from tasks and the skills are rated directly in terms of importance of frequency. This often results in data that immediately imply the important KSAOs. However, it can be hard for SMEs to rate skills directly.

The Fleishman Job Analysis System (F-JAS) developed by Edwin A. Fleishman represents a worker-oriented approach. Fleishman factor-analyzed large data sets to discover a common, minimum set of KSAOs across different jobs. His system of 73 specific scales measure three broad areas: Cognitive (Verbal Abilities; Idea Generation & Reasoning Abilities; Quantitative Abilities; Memory; Perceptual Abilities; Spatial Abilities; and Attentiveness), Psychomotor (Fine Manipulative Abilities; Control Movement Abilities; and Reaction Time and Speed Abilities), and Physical (Physical Strength Abilities; Endurance; Flexibility, Balance, and Coordination; Visual Abilities; and Auditory and Speech Abilities).

JobScan is a measurement instrument which defines the personality dynamics within a specific type of job. By collecting PDP ProScan Survey results of actual performers and results of job dynamics analysis surveys completed by knowledgeable people related to a specific job, JobScan provides a suggested ideal job model for that position. Although it does not evaluate the intellect or experience necessary to accomplish a task, it does deal with the personality of the type of work itself.

== Example ==
For the job of a snowcat operator at a ski slope, a work or task-oriented job analysis might include this statement: Operates Bombardier Sno-cat, usually at night, to smooth out snow rutted by skiers and snowboard riders and new snow that has fallen. On the other hand, a worker-oriented job analysis might include this statement: Evaluates terrain, snow depth, and snow condition and chooses the correct setting for the depth of the snow cat, as well as the number of passes necessary on a given ski slope.

Job analysis methods have evolved using both task-oriented and worker-oriented approaches. Since the end result of both approaches is a statement of KSAOs, neither can be considered the "correct" way to conduct job analysis. Because worker-oriented job analyses tend to provide more generalized human behavior and behavior patterns and are less tied to the technological parts of a job, they produce data more useful for developing training programs and giving feed back to employees in the form of performance appraisal information. Also, the volatility that exists in the typical workplace of today can make specific task statements less valuable in isolation. For these reasons, employers are significantly more likely to use worker-oriented approaches to job analysis today than they were in the past.

== Knowledge, skills, abilities and other characteristics (KSAOs) ==
Regardless of which approach to job analysis is taken, the next step in the process is to identify the attributes—the KSAOs that an incumbent needs for either performing the tasks at hand or executing the human behaviors described in the job analysis.

- Knowledge: "A collection of discrete but related facts and information about a particular domain...acquired through formal education or training, or accumulated through specific experiences."
- Skill: "A practiced act".
- Ability: "The stable capacity to engage in a specific behavior"
- Other characteristics: "Personality variables, interests, training, and experiences"

Finally, once the appropriate KSAOs are identified, tests and other assessment techniques can be chosen to measure those KSAOs. Over the years, experts have presented several different systems and methods to accomplish job analysis. Many forms of systems are no longer in use, but those systems that still exist have become increasingly detailed over the decades with a greater concentration on tasks and less concentration on human attributes. That trend, however, has reversed in recent years for the better. Newer methods and systems have brought I-O psychology back to an examination of the behavioral aspects of work.

There are several ways to conduct a job analysis, including interviews with incumbents and supervisors, work methods of analysis can be laborious and time-consuming, and there is always a tendency on the part of management to over analyze some jobs and under analyze some others. These traditional job analysis methods include: one-on-one interviewing; behavioral event interviews; phone interviews; surveys; work assessments; Developing a Curriculum (DACUM); job analysis worksheets; observations and procedural review. Job analysis at the speed of reality. Amherst, Mass.: HRD Press. All of these methods can be used to gather information for job analysis. The DACUM process developed in the late 1960s has been viewed as the fastest method used, but it can still can take two or three days to obtain a validated task list.

Observation: This was the first method of job analysis used by I-O psychologists. The process involves simply watching incumbents perform their jobs and taking notes. Sometimes they ask questions while watching, and commonly they even perform job tasks themselves. Near the end of World War II, Morris Viteles studied the job of navigator on a submarine. He attempted to steer the submarine toward Bermuda. After multiple misses by over 100 miles in one direction or another, one officer suggested that Viteles raise the periscope, look for clouds, and steer toward them since clouds tend to form above or near land masses. The vessel reached Bermuda shortly after that suggestion. The more jobs one seriously observes, the better one's understanding becomes of both the jobs in question and work in general.

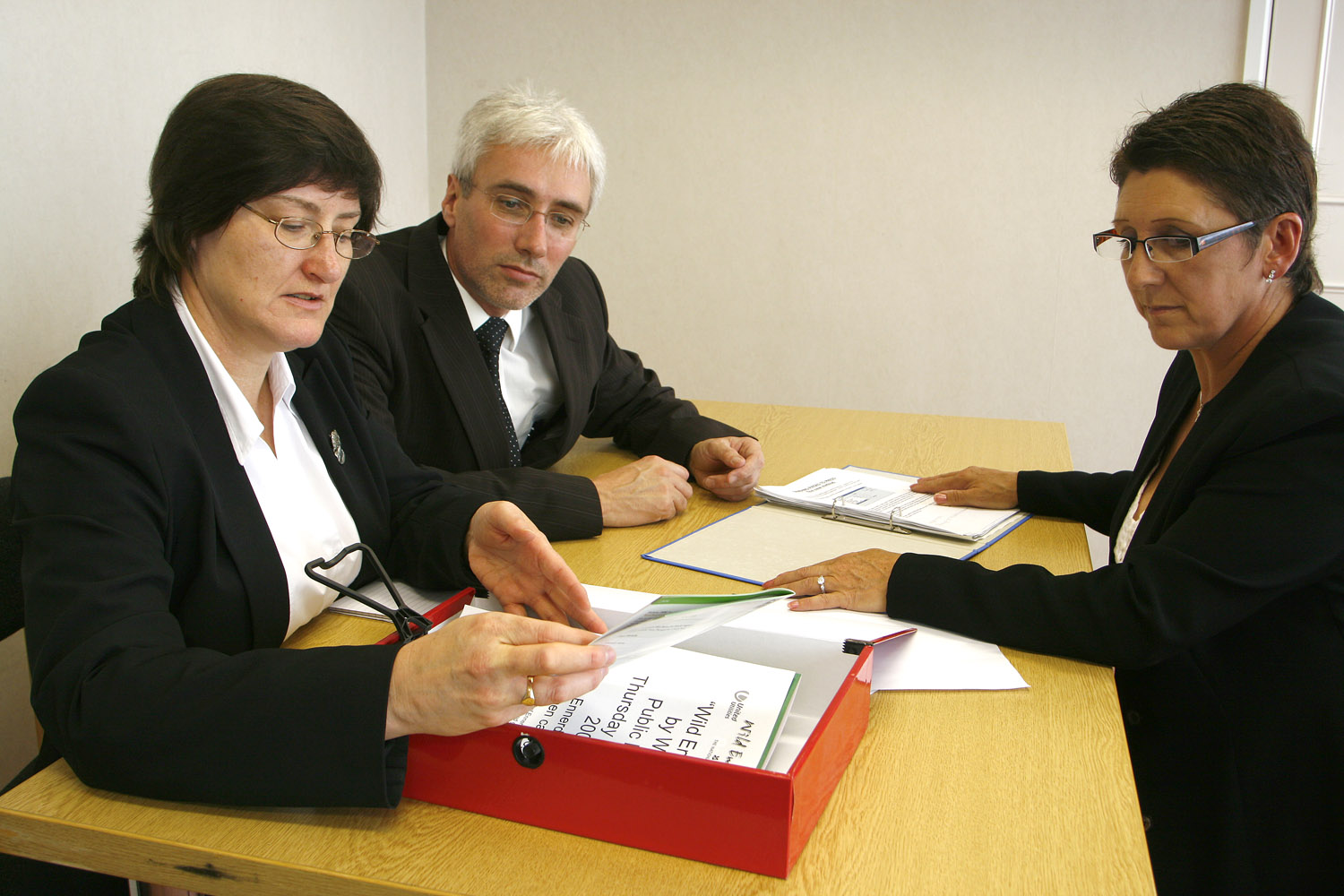
Interviews with incumbents are one method of conducting a job analysis.

Interviews: It is essential to supplement observation by talking with incumbents. These interviews are most effective when structured with a specific set of questions based on observations, other analyses of the types of jobs in question, or prior discussions with human resources representatives, trainers, or managers knowledgeable about jobs.

Critical incidents and work diaries: The critical incident technique asks subject matter experts to identify critical aspects of behavior or performance in a particular job that led to success or failure. For example, the supervisor of an electric utility repairman might report that in a very time-pressing project, the repairman failed to check a blueprint and as a result cut a line, causing a massive power loss. In fact, this is what happened in Los Angeles in September 2005 when half the city lost power over a period of 12 hours. The second method, a work diary, asks workers and/or supervisors to keep a log of activities over a prescribed period of time. They may be asked to simply write down what they were doing at 15 minutes after the hour for each hour of the work day. Or, they may list everything they have done up to a break.

Questionnaires and surveys: Expert incumbents or supervisors often respond to questionnaires or surveys as a part of job analysis. These questionnaires include task statements in the form of worker behaviors. Subject matter experts are asked to rate each statement form their experience on a number of different dimensions like importance to overall job success, frequency performance and whether the task must be performed on the first day of work or can be learned gradually on the job. Questionnaires also ask incumbents to rate the importance of KSAOs for performing tasks, and may ask the subject matter experts to rate work context. Unlike the results of observations and interviews, the questionnaire responses can be statistically analyzed to provide a more objective record of the components of the job. To a greater and greater extent, these questionnaires and surveys are being administered online to incumbents.

Position Analysis Questionnaire: The Position Analysis Questionnaire (PAQ) is a well-known job analysis instrument. Although it is labeled a questionnaire, the PAQ is actually designed to be completed by a trained job analyst who interviews the SMEs (e.g., job incumbents and their supervisors).[2] The PAQ was designed to measure job component validity of attributes presented in aptitude tests. Job component validity is the relationship between test scores and skills required for good job performance. There are 195 behavior-related statements in the PAQ divided into six major sections: information input, mental process, work output, relationships with others, job context, and other job characteristics.

Checklists: Checklists are also used as a job analysis method, specifically with areas like the Air Force. In the checklist method, the incumbent checks the tasks he or she performs from a list of task statements that describe the job. The checklist is preceded by some sort of job analysis and is usually followed by the development of work activity compilations or job descriptions. The scope of task statements listed depends upon the judgment of the checklist constructor.

== Six steps ==
1. Decide how to use the information since this will determine the data to collect and how to collect it. Some data collection techniques such as interviewing the employee and asking what the job entails are good for writing job descriptions and selecting employees for the job. Other techniques like the position analysis questionnaire do not provide qualitative information for job descriptions. Rather, they provide numerical ratings for each job and can be used to compare jobs for compensation purposes.
2. Review appropriate background information like organization charts, process charts, and job descriptions. Organization charts show the organization-wide work division, how the job in question relates to other jobs, and where the job fits in the overall organization. The chart should show the title of each position and, through connecting lines, show reports to whom and with whom the job incumbent communicates. A process chart provides a more detailed picture of the workflow. In its simplest, most organic form, a process chart shows the flow of inputs to and outputs from the job being analyzed. Finally, the existing job description (if there is one) usually provides a starting point for building the revised job description.
3. Select representative positions. This is because there may be too many similar jobs to analyze. For example, it is usually unnecessary to analyze jobs of 200 assembly workers when a sample of 10 jobs will be sufficient.
4. Actually analyze the job by collecting data on job activities, necessary employee behaviors and actions, working conditions, and human traits and abilities required to perform the job. For this step, one or more than one methods of job analysis may be needed
5. Verify the job analysis information with the worker performing the job and with his or her immediate supervisor. This will help confirm that the information is factually correct and complete. This review can also help gain the employee's acceptance of the job analysis data and conclusions by giving that person a chance to review and modify descriptions of the job activities.
6. Develop a job description and job specification. These are two tangible products of the job analysis process. The job description is a written statement that describes the activities and responsibilities of the job as well as its important features such as working conditions and safety hazards. The job specification summarizes the personal qualities, traits, skills, and background required for completing a certain job. These two may be completely separate or in the same document.

== Uses of information ==
1. Recruitment and selection : An organization distinguishes a pool of potential candidates for a job position from the overall population of available workers through the process of recruitment; this is followed by selection, during which the applicants who will be employed by the company are definitively chosen. The former process attracts workers to apply using various methods of advertising the open position, which can include newspapers advertisements, government agencies, or verbal referrals. The latter process can involve interviews with individual applicants or reviews of their previous work experience. Job analysis produces both an explanation of the activities and responsibilities that an employee in a certain position must undertake while working (a job description) as well as that of the ideal characteristics and abilities that the employee should have in order to perform well (a job specification). These pieces of information can be used in recruitment by contributing to the content of a company's advertisements, helping ensure that the candidates with the correct attributes apply, and in selection by certifying that the chosen candidates are fit for the position.
2. Compensation: The payments made by an organization to its employees for their services to the company, through an hourly wage or otherwise, is known as compensation. Job evaluation attempts to determine the value of a job position compared to others within the same organization, to help ensure that the compensation of employees in various positions is equitable. Job analysis can be used during job evaluation by providing descriptions of positions that will be ranked; rankings may sometimes be based on the appearance of predetermined factors that have been deemed important in the descriptions. Other pieces of information, such as the salaries that employees of other organizations with the same job position earn, are generally considered in combination with job evaluation to determine specific compensation rates.
3. Performance appraisal: A performance appraisal compares each employee's actual performance with his or her performance standards. Managers use job analysis to determine the job's specific activities and performance standards.
4. Training: The job description should show the activities and skills, and therefore training, that the job requires
5. Discovering unassigned duties: Job Analysis can also help reveal unassigned duties. For example, a company's production manager says an employee is responsible for ten duties, such as production scheduling and raw material purchasing. Missing, however, is any reference to managing raw material inventories. On further study, it is revealed that none of the other manufacturing employees are responsible for inventory management, either. From review of other jobs like these, it is clear that someone should be managing raw material inventories. Therefore, an essential unassigned duty has been revealed.
6. EEO compliance: Job analysis plays a large role in EEO compliance. United States Federal Agencies' Uniform Guidelines on Employee Selection stipulate that job analysis is a necessary step in validating all major personnel activities. For example, employers must be able to show that their selection criteria and job performance are actually related. Doing this requires knowing what the job entails, which in turn requires job analysis.

Additional purposes: In addition to the 6 purposes above, Ash and Levine listed determining KSAOs needed for promotion, determining workplace hazards to make jobs safer, job classification, job description, designing the content of jobs, and strategic human resource planning.

== Job Analysis at the Speed of Reality (JASR) ==
The Job Analysis at the Speed of Reality (JASR) method for job analysis is a reliable, proven method to quickly create validated task lists. The end product, which can be used for many purposes, is the basis for many potential training opportunities. This method is a tested process that helps analysts complete a job analysis of a typical job with a group of subject matter experts and managers in two to three hours then deliver a validated task list.

1. Job incumbents should know their jobs better than anyone else. They can provide accurate, timely content information about the job.
2. JASR participants want to spend a minimum amount of time providing job data during a session and business leadership wants to minimize disruption to business operations.
3. Since JASR participants do not spend as much time thinking about training as training professionals do, they do not require much orientation to the process.
4. JASR uses the quickest methods and best possible technology to complete the job analysis.

== Systems ==
For many years, the U.S. Department of Labor published the Dictionary of Occupational Titles (DOT), which was a comprehensive description of over 20,000 jobs. However, the Department replaced the DOT with O*NET online database, which includes all occupations from the DOT plus an additional 3,500. This makes O*NET very useful for job analysis.

The O*NET (an online resource which has replaced the Dictionary of Occupational Titles) lists job requirements for a variety of jobs and is often considered basic, generic, or initial job analysis data. Everyone can use this database at no cost and is continually updated by observing workers from each occupation. O*NET also has a Career Exploration Tool which is an assessment to help workers and students who are searching for new careers. Data available from O*NET includes physical requirements, educational level, and some mental requirements. Task-based statements describing the work performed are derived from the functional job analysis technique. O*NET also provides links to salary data at the US national, state and city level for each job.

O*NET was designed with several features in mind, including:

- The inclusion of multiple descriptors and content domains to capture the range of ways that work can be described
- The development of cross-job descriptors in order to enable comparisons between various jobs
- The use of a taxonomic approach to occupational classification to enable full coverage within a content domain

Using these principles, a content model was developed that identified six content domains and specific categories within each domain. These six domains and categories within them include:

1. Worker characteristics: enduring individual attributes that influence the capacities workers can develop - abilities, occupational values and interests, and work styles
2. Worker requirements: general attributes developed through education and experience, thus are more amenable to change than worker characteristics - knowledge skills and education
3. Occupational requirements: descriptors of the work itself rather than the worker - Generalized work activities, work context, and organizational context
4. Experience requirements: types and quantities of experience required for specific occupations - worker experience in other jobs, related training, on-the-job training, and certification requirements
5. Individual occupation characteristics: reflects labor demand, supply, and other labor market information
6. Occupation-specific requirements: information unique to a particular job - occupation-specific skills and knowledge, tasks and duties, and equipment used

== In modern United States ==
Over the past years, the concept of job analysis has been changing dramatically. One observer put it: "The modern world is on the verge of another huge leap in creativity and productivity, but the job is not going to be part of tomorrow's economic reality. There still is and will always be an enormous amount of work to do, but it is not going to be contained in the familiar envelopes we call jobs. In fact, many organizations are today well along the path toward being "de-jobbed."."

Jobs and job descriptions, until recently, tended to follow their prescriptions and to be fairly detailed and specific. By the mid-1900s writers were reacting to what they viewed as "dehumanizing" aspects of pigeonholing workings into highly repetitive and specialized jobs; many proposed solutions like job enlargement, job rotation, and job enrichment. Job enlargement means assigning workers additional same-level tasks, thus increasing the number of activities they perform. Job rotation means systematically moving workers from one job to another. Psychologist Frederick Herzberg argued that the best way to motivate workers is to build opportunities for challenge and achievement into their jobs through job enrichment. Job enrichment means re-designing jobs in a way that increases the opportunities for the worker to experience feelings of responsibility, achievement, growth and recognition.

Whether enriched, specialized or enlarged, workers still generally have specific jobs to do, and these jobs have required job descriptions. In many firms today, however, jobs are becoming more amorphous and difficult to define. In other words, the trend is toward dehubbing.

Dejobbing, broadening the responsibilities of the company's jobs, and encouraging employees to not limit themselves to what's on their job descriptions, is a result of the changes taking place in business today. Organizations need to grapple with trends like rapid product and technological changes, and a shift to a service economy. This has increased the need for firms to be responsive, flexible, and generally more competitive. In turn, the organizational methods managers use to accomplish this have helped weaken the meaning of a job as a well-defined and clearly delineated set of responsibilities. Here are some methods that have contributed to this weakening of JOB's meaning:

- Flatter organizations: Instead of traditional pyramid-shaped organizations with seven or more management layers, flat organizations with only three or four levels are becoming more prevalent
- Work teams: Managers increasingly organize tasks around teams and processes rather than around specialized functions. In an organization like this, employees' jobs change daily and there is an intentional effort to avoid having employees view their jobs as a specific set of responsibilities. An example of this in action in information technology is the Scrum methodology in software development, which specifically states that within the Scrum process, the only recognized title for team members is "team member" - although in practice many IT organizations ignore this aspect of Scrum as it is perceived as "too radical" for them to cope with.
- The Boundaryless Organization: In a boundaryless organization, the widespread use of teams and similar structural mechanisms reduces and makes more permeable the boundaries that typically separate departments and hierarchical levels. These organizations foster responsiveness by encouraging employees to rid themselves of the 'it's not my job' attitudes that typically create walls between one employee's area and another's. Instead, the focus is on defining the project or task at hand in terms of the overall best interests of the organization, therefore further reducing the idea of a job as a clearly defined set of duties.

Most firms today continue to use job analysis and rely on jobs as traditionally defined. More firms are moving toward new organizational configurations built around jobs that are broad and could change daily. Also, modern job analysis and job design techniques could help companies implement high-performance strategies.

== See also ==
- Industrial & organizational psychology
- Staffing models
- Task analysis
- Work sampling

== Other sources ==
- Fine, Sidney A. & Cronshaw, Steven F. (1999). Functional job analysis: A foundation for human resources management. Erlbaum: Mahwah, NJ.
