= Cognitive ergonomics =

Designing to suit cognitive abilities

Cognitive ergonomics is a scientific discipline that studies, evaluates, and designs tasks, jobs, products, environments and systems and how they interact with humans and their cognitive abilities. It is defined by the International Ergonomics Association as "concerned with mental processes, such as perception, memory, reasoning, and motor response, as they affect interactions among humans and other elements of a system. Cognitive ergonomics examines how mental processes affect work, with the quality of performance depending on a person’s understanding of situations. Situations could include the goals, means, and constraints of work. The relevant topics include mental workload, decision-making, skilled performance, human-computer interaction, human reliability, work stress and training as these may relate to human-system design." Cognitive ergonomics studies cognition in work and operational settings, in order to optimize human well-being and system performance. It is a subset of the larger field of human factors and ergonomics.

== Goals ==
Cognitive ergonomics (sometimes known as cognitive engineering though this was an earlier field) is an emerging branch of ergonomics. It places particular emphasis on the analysis of cognitive processes required of operators in modern industries and similar milieus. This can be done by studying cognition in work and operational settings. It aims to ensure there is an appropriate interaction between human factors and processes that can be done throughout everyday life. This would include everyday life such as work tasks. Some cognitive ergonomics aims are: diagnosis, workload, situation awareness, decision making, and planning. CE is used to describe how work affects the mind and how the mind affects work. Its aim is to apply general principles and good practices of cognitive ergonomics that help to avoid unnecessary cognitive load at work and improves human performance. In a practical purpose, it will aid in human nature and limitations through additional help in information processing. Another goal related to the study of cognitive ergonomics is correct diagnosis. Because cognitive ergonomics is a small priority for many, it is especially important to diagnose and help what is needed. A comparison would be fixing what does not need to be fixed or vice-a-versa. Cognitive ergonomics aims at enhancing performance of cognitive tasks by means of several interventions, including these:

- user-centered design of human-machine interaction and human-computer interaction (HCI);
- design of information technology systems that support cognitive tasks (e.g., cognitive artifacts);
- development of training programs;
- work redesign to manage cognitive workload and increase human reliability.
- designed to be "easy to use" and accessible by everyone

== History ==
The field of cognitive ergonomics emerged predominantly in the 70's with the advent of the personal computer and new developments in the fields of cognitive psychology and artificial intelligence. It studied how human cognitive psychology works hand-in-hand with specific cognitive limitations. This could only be done through time and trial and error. CE contrasts the tradition of physical ergonomics because "cognitive ergonomics is...the application of psychology to work...to achieve the optimization between people and their work." Viewed as an applied science, the methods involved with creating cognitive ergonomic design have changed with the rapid development in technological advances over the last 27 years. In the 80's, there was a worldwide transition in the methodological approach to design. According to van der Veer, Enid Mumford was one of the pioneers of interactive systems engineering, and advocated the notion of user-centered design, wherein the user is considered and "included in all phases of the design". Cognitive ergonomics as defined by the International Ergonomics Association "is concerned with mental processes, such as perception, memory, reasoning, and motor response, as they affect interactions among humans and other elements of a system". It studies the cognition in work to help with the human well-being in system performances.

There are several different models which describe the criteria for designing user-friendly technology. A number of models focus on a systematic process for design, using task analysis to evaluate the cognitive processes involved with a given task and develop adequate interface capabilities. Task analysis in past research has focused on the evaluation of cognitive task demands, concerning motor control and cognition during visual tasks such as operating machinery, or the evaluation of attention and focus via the analysis of eye saccades of pilots when flying. Neuroergonomics, a subfield of cognitive ergonomics, aims to enhance human-computer interaction by using neural correlates to better understand situational task demands. Neuroergonomic research at the university of Iowa has been involved with assessing safe-driving protocol, enhancing elderly mobility, and analyzing cognitive abilities involved with the navigation of abstract virtual environments." Now, cognitive ergonomics adapts to technological advances because as technology advances new cognitive demands arise. This is called changes in socio-technical context. For example, when computers became popular in the 80's, there were new cognitive demands for operating them. Meaning, as new technology arises, humans will now have to adapt to the change leaving a deficiency somewhere else.

Human Computer Interaction has a huge part in cognitive ergonomics because we are in a time period where most of life is digitalized. This created new problems and solutions. Studies show that most of the problems that happen are due to the digitalization of dynamic systems. With this it created a rise in the diversity in methods on how to process many streams of information. The changes in our socio-technical contexts adds to the stress of methods of visualization and analysis, along with the capabilities regarding cognitive perceptions by the user.

== Methods ==
Successful ergonomic intervention in the area of cognitive tasks requires a thorough understanding not only of the demands of the work situation, but also of user strategies in performing cognitive tasks and of limitations in human cognition. In some cases, the artifacts or tools used to carry out a task may impose their own constraints and limitations (e.g., navigating through a large number of GUI screens). Tools may also co-determine the very nature of the task. In this sense, the analysis of cognitive tasks should examine both the interaction of users with their work setting and the user interaction with artifacts or tools; the latter is very important as modern artifacts (e.g., control panels, software, expert systems) become increasingly sophisticated. Emphasis lies on how to design human-machine interfaces and cognitive artifacts so that human performance is sustained in work environments where information may be unreliable, events may be difficult to predict, multiple simultaneous goals may be in conflict, and performance may be time-constrained.

A proposed way of expanding a user's effectiveness with cognitive ergonomics is to expand the interdisciplinary connections related to normal dynamics. The method behind this is to transfer the pre-existing knowledge of the various mechanics in computers into structural patterns of cognitive space. This would work with human factors in developing an intellectual learning support system and applying an interdisciplinary methodology of training, helping the effective interaction between the person and the computer with the strengthening of critical thinking and intuition.

== Disability ==
Accessibility is important in cognitive ergonomics because it is one pathway to build better user experience. The term accessibility refers to how people with disabilities access or benefit from a site, system, or application. Section 508 is the founding principle for accessibility . In the U.S., Section 508 of the Rehabilitation Act is one of several disability laws and requires federal agencies to develop, maintain, and use their information and communications technology (ICT) accessible to people with disabilities, regardless if they work for the federal government or not. Section 508 also implies that any people with disabilities applying for a federal government job or any person using the website to get general information about a program or completing an online form has access to the same information and resources that are obtainable by anyone. Accessibility can be implemented by making sites that can present information through multiple sensory channels with sound and sight. The strategic multi-sensory approach and a multi-interactivity approach allows disabled users to access the same information as nondisabled users. This allows for additional means of site navigation and interactivity beyond the typical point-and-click-interface: keyboard-based control and voice-based navigation. Accessibility is very valuable because it ensures that all potential users, including people with disabilities have a good user experience and can easily access information. Overall, it improves usability for all people that use a site.

Some of the best practices for accessible content include:

- Not relying on color as a navigational tool or as the only way to differentiate items
- Images should include "alt text" in the markup/code and complex images should have more extensive descriptions near the image (caption or descriptive summaries built right into a neighboring paragraph)
- Functionality should be accessible through mouse and keyboard and be tagged to work with voice-control systems
- Transcripts should be provided for podcasts
- Videos on your site must provide visual access to the audio information through in-sync captioning
- Sites should have a skip navigation feature
- Consider 508 testing to assure your site is in compliance

== User interface modeling ==
=== Cognitive task analysis ===
Cognitive task analysis is a general term for the set of methods used to identify the mental demands and cognitive skills needed to complete a task. Frameworks like GOMS provide a formal set of methods for identifying the mental activities required by a task and an artifact, such as a desktop computer system. By identifying the sequence of mental activities of a user engaged in a task, cognitive ergonomics engineers can identify bottlenecks and critical paths that may present opportunities for improvement or risks (such as human error) that merit changes in training or system behavior. It is the whole study of what we know, how we think, and how we organize new information.

== Applications ==
As a design philosophy, cognitive ergonomics can be applied to any area where humans interact with technology. Applications include aviation (e.g., cockpit layouts), transportation (e.g., collision avoidance), the health care system (e.g., drug bottle labelling), mobile devices, appliance interface design, product design, and nuclear power plants.

The focus of cognitive ergonomics is to be simple, clear and "easy to use" and accessible to everyone. Softwares are designed to help make better use of this. Its aim is to design icons and visual cues that are "easy" to use and function by all.

== See also ==
- Activity theory – Soviet psychological framework
- Cognitive psychology – Subdiscipline of psychology
- Cognitive science – Interdisciplinary scientific study of cognitive processes
- Cognitive work analysis – Framework for describing complex systems
- Cultural anthropology – Branch of anthropology focused on the study of cultural variation among humans
- Distributed cognition – Psychologic theory
- Ecological interface design – Approach to interface design
- Engineering psychology – Human behavior in the design and operation of systems and technology
- Ethnography – Systematic study of people and cultures
- Ethnomethodology – Study of how social order is produced
- Human–computer interaction
- Mental space – Theoretical construct corresponding to a possible world
- Neuroergonomics – Application of neuroscience to ergonomics
- Person–environment fit – Compatibility of characteristics
- Personality–job fit theory – Form of organizational psychology
- Supervisory control – Control of many individual controllers or control loops
- Systems engineering – Interdisciplinary field of engineering
