= John Senders =

Professor of industrial engineering (1920–2019)

John W. Senders (1920 – Feb 12, 2019) was an American professor of industrial engineering and psychology who did research on safety and human error. He founded Canada's Institute for Safe Medication Practices (ISMP), introduced the visual occlusion paradigm, and organized the first conference on human error, which came to be known as Clambake I.

== Early life ==
Senders was born in Cambridge, Massachusetts, to a family of Russian immigrants with five children. He was the youngest of the five and benefited from an environment full of books, fierce competition, scientific inquiry, and word games. Accepted at age 16 to Antioch College in Yellow Springs, Ohio, he was sent home a year later for his refusal to take a required first-year math course, saying, “I’ve known this stuff since I was 7, and I’ll be damned if I’ll do it again.” In expelling him, the administration made an exception to its famously lenient policies. Years later, he continued his undergraduate education at Harvard.

== Education ==
Senders received an A.B. in experimental psychology from Harvard College in 1948, and a Ph.D. in quantitative psychology from Tilburg University in 1983.

== Career ==
In 1959, Senders was a lecturer in the department of mechanical engineering at the University of Minnesota.

From 1965 to 1972, Senders, was a lecturer and senior research associate in psychology at Brandeis University.

In 1973, Senders took a position as a visiting professor in the department of mechanical and industrial engineering at the University of Toronto. He took a permanent position at the university in 1974 where he worked until he retired in 1985, when he became a Professor Emeritus.

== Awards and honors ==
Due to his recognized contributions in engineering psychology, Senders was welcomed as a full member of the American Psychological Association (APA) long before he had gained a doctoral degree (which used to be a criterion for APA membership) and as a member of the Communications Committee, contributed to development of a National Information System for Psychology in the early 1970s. [11]

In 1973, Senders was elected as a fellow of the American Association for the Advancement of Science.

Senders founded Canada's Institute for Safe Medication Practices (ISMP), and received an award from ISMP in 2001.

In 2008, Senders was awarded the Knowledge Media Design Institute (KMDI) Pioneer Award by the University of Toronto.

In 2010, the Human Factors Interest Group of the University of Toronto held a symposium of Applied Human Factors Research in Senders's honor. Attendees included Abigail Sellen, Neville Moray (remotely), Shuman Zhai, Don Norman, and Jean Zu.

In 2011, Senders won an Ig Nobel Prize in the field of public safety for conducting experiments driving a car while intermittently blindfolded.

== Clambake conferences ==
Senders, along with his wife Ann Chrichton-Harris, organized a meeting in Columbia Falls, Maine in July 1980 of researchers who were interested in studying human error. They originally submitted a proposal for funding the conference to the National Science Foundation, but the proposal was rejected. They decided to invite participants despite the lack of funding, inviting the attendees to attend a clambake. Twenty-five people attended, from the United States and the United Kingdom. This meeting came to be known as the "Clambake Conference" and Clambake I.

In 1983, a multidisciplinary conference on human error was held at the Rockefeller Foundation's Bellagio Center in Triangolo lariano, Italy, funded by NATO and the Rockefeller Foundation. This conference came to be known as Clambake II. Senders, along with Neville Moray, published a summary of the workshop.

In addition to Senders, Chrichton-Harris, and Moray, participants at the clambake conferences included Jens Rasmussen, Daniel Kahneman, Don Norman, James Reason, Alan Swain, Thomas Sheridan, Elizabeth Loftus, Erik Hollnagel, David Woods, Ward Edwards, Brian Gaines, Marcel Kinsbourne, Lawrence Stark, Anne Treisman, Laurence Young, and Dune McRuer.
