= Robert Hoffman (psychologist) =

American psychologist (born 1950)

Robert Hoffman is an American cognitive psychologist and emeritus senior research scientist at the Institute for Human and Machine Cognition (IHMC) in Pensacola, Florida. His research research focuses on cognitive systems engineering and macrocognitive work systems. He is a fellow of the Association for Psychological Science and the Human Factors and Ergonomics Society.

== Education ==
He earned his Bachelor of Arts in psychology in 1972, Master of Arts in experimental psychology in 1974 and a Ph.D. in experimental psychology in 1976 from University of Cincinnati.

== Career ==
He has served as a Senior Research Scientist at the Institute for Human and Machine Cognition (IHMC) in Pensacola, Florida, where he conducts research in cognitive systems engineering, expertise studies, and human-centered computing. He also served as a Faculty Associate in the Department of Computer Science and the School of Psychological & Behavioral Sciences at the University of West Florida.

His research spans psychology, human factors engineering, artificial intelligence, remote sensing, and weather forecasting.

His research also focuses on cognitive systems engineering, expertise training, and human-centered computing.
