= Systematic process =

A systematic process is often closely associated with critical thinking.

In general the application of a systematic process is regarded as a means of management aimed at reducing the number and severity of mistakes, errors and failures due to either human or technological functions involved.

Use of systematic process in strategic planning has been both challenged, due to rapid change in market conditions, and advocated as a source of improvement. For example, "Many OECD countries have a transparent and systematic process of public consultation to enhance the quality of the regulatory process by guaranteeing that the impact on citizens and businesses is taken into account."
