= Endogeneity =

In a variety of contexts endogeneity is the property of being influenced within a system. It appears in specific contexts as such as economics, statistics, and social sciences. Specific examples are as follows:

In context of economics:

- Endogeneity (econometrics)
- Exogenous and endogenous variables in economic models
- Endogenous growth theory in economics
- Endogenous preferences in economics
- Endogenous money

In context of biology and medicine:

- Endogenous depression

== See also ==
- Endogeny (biology)
- Exogeny
