= Cognitive systems engineering =

Field of study

Cognitive systems engineering (CSE) is an interdisciplinary field that examines the intersection of people, work, and technology, with a particular focus on safety-critical systems. The central tenet of CSE is to treat collections of people and technologies as a single unified entity—called a joint cognitive system (JCS)—capable of performing cognitive work rather than as separate human and technological components. The field was formally established in the early 1980s by Erik Hollnagel and David Woods.

Unlike cognitive engineering, which primarily applies cognitive science to design technological systems that support user cognition, CSE takes a more holistic approach by analyzing how cognition is distributed across entire work systems. This perspective emphasizes understanding the functional relationships between humans and technology in complex operational environments such as air traffic control, medical systems, nuclear power plants, and other high-risk contexts.

CSE draws on theoretical foundations from multiple disciplines including cognitive psychology, cognitive anthropology, systems theory, and ecological psychology. Key intellectual influences include Edwin Hutchins's distributed cognition, James Gibson's ecological theory of visual perception, Ulric Neisser's perceptual cycle, and William Clancey's situated cognition. The field has also been shaped by Jens Rasmussen's work on human error and abstraction hierarchy.

Methodologically, CSE employs techniques such as cognitive task analysis, cognitive work analysis, and work domain analysis to understand how cognition is distributed across human and technological agents. These approaches focus on identifying system constraints and designing for resilience rather than merely preventing errors.

== History ==
Cognitive systems engineering emerged in the wake of the Three Mile Island (TMI) accident. At the time, existing theories about safety were unable to explain how the operators at TMI could be confused about what was actually happening inside of the plant.

Following the accident, Jens Rasmussen did early research on cognitive aspects of nuclear power plant control rooms. This work influenced a generation of researchers who would later come to be associated with cognitive systems engineering, including Morten Lind, Erik Hollnagel, and David Woods.

Following the publication of a textbook on cognitive systems engineering by Kim Vicente in 1999 the techniques employed to establish a cognitive work analysis (CWA) were used to aid the design of any kind of system were humans have to interact with technology. The tools outlined by Vicente were not tried and tested, and there are few if any published accounts of the five phases of analysis being implemented.

=== "Cognitive systems engineering" vs "Cognitive engineering" ===
The term "cognitive systems engineering" was introduced in a 1983 paper by Hollnagel and Woods.

Although the term cognitive engineering had already been introduced by Don Norman, Hollnagel and Woods deliberately introduced new terminology. They were unhappy with the framing of the term cognitive engineering, which they felt focused too much on improving the interaction between humans and computers, through the application of cognitive science. Instead, Hollnagel and Woods wished to emphasize a shift in focus from human-computer interaction to joint cognitive systems as the unit of analysis.

Despite the intention by Hollnagel and Woods to distinguish cognitive engineering from cognitive systems engineering, some researchers continue to use the two terms interchangeably.

== Themes ==
=== Joint cognitive systems ===
As mentioned in the Origins section above, one of the key tenets of cognitive systems engineering is that the base unit of analysis is the joint cognitive system. Instead of viewing cognitive tasks as being done only by individuals, CSE views cognitive work as being accomplished by a collection of people coordinating with each other and using technology to jointly perform cognitive work as a system.

=== Studying work in context ===
CSE researchers focus their studies on work in situ, as opposed to studying how work is done in controlled laboratory environments. This research approach, known as macrocognition, is similar to the one taken by naturalistic decision-making. Examples of studies of work done in context include Julian Orr's ethnographic studies of copy machine technicians, Lucy Suchman's ethnographic studies of how people use photocopiers, Diane Vaughan's study of engineering work at NASA in the wake of the Space Shuttle Challenger disaster, and Scott Snook's study of military work in the wake of the 1994 Black Hawk shootdown incident.

=== Coping with complexity ===
A general thread that runs through cognitive systems engineering research is the question of how to design joint cognitive systems that can deal effectively with complexity, including common patterns in how such systems can fail to deal effectively with complexity.

=== Anomaly response ===
As mentioned in the Origins section above, CSE researchers were influenced by TMI. One specific application of coping with complexity is the work that human operators must do when they are supervising a process such as nuclear power plant, and they must then deal with a problem that arises. This work is sometimes known as anomaly response or dynamic fault management. This type of work often involves uncertainty, quickly changing conditions, and risk tradeoffs in deciding what remediation actions to take.

=== Coordination ===
Because joint cognitive systems involve multiple agents that must work together to complete cognitive tasks, coordination is another topic of interest in CSE. One specific example is the notion of common ground and its implications for building software that can contribute effectively as agents in a joint cognitive system.

=== Cognitive artifacts ===
CSE researchers study how people use technology to support cognitive work and coordinate this work across multiple people. Examples of such cognitive artifacts, which have been studied by researchers, include "the bed book" used in intensive care units, "voice loops" used in space operations, "speed bugs" used in aviation, drawings and sketches in engineering work, and the various tools used in marine navigation.

Of particular interest to CSE researchers is how computer-based tools influence joint cognitive work, in particular the impact of automation, and computerized interfaces used by system operators.

== Founders and foundational contributors ==
- Erik Hollnagel*
- David Woods*
- Robert R. Hoffman
- Philip Smith
- Jens Rasmussen
- Emily Roth
- Gary Klein

== Books ==
- Cognitive Systems Engineering: The Future for a Changing World by Philip J. Smith and Robbert R. Hoffman, eds. 2017
- Joint Cognitive Systems: Patterns in Cognitive Systems Engineering by David Woods and Erik Hollnagel, 2005. 978-0849328213
- Joint Cognitive Systems: Foundations of Cognitive Systems Engineering by Erik Hollnagel and David Woods, 2005. 978-0367864156
- Cognitive Systems Engineering by Jens Rasmussen, Annelise Mark Pejtersen, and L.P. Goodstein, 1994.

== See also ==
- Cognitive work analysis
- Ecological interface design
