= Amsterdam plane crash =

Amsterdam plane crash may refer to:

- El Al Flight 1862, which crashed into an apartment building in Bijlmermeer in 1992
- Turkish Airlines Flight 1951, which crashed near Amsterdam Airport Schiphol in 2009
