= Cognitive work analysis =

Framework for describing complex systems

Cognitive work analysis (CWA) is a conceptual framework developed to model complex sociotechnical systems with a focus on understanding work constraints rather than prescribing specific procedures. Originally developed at Risø National Laboratory in Denmark by Jens Rasmussen and colleagues in the 1980s, CWA emerged as part of the broader field of cognitive engineering.

The framework systematically analyzes different types of constraints to build a comprehensive model of how work could potentially proceed within a given system. This distinguishes CWA from other task analysis approaches that either describe how work is actually conducted (descriptive modeling) or prescribe how it should be conducted (normative modeling). Instead, CWA adopts a formative approach by identifying the constraints that shape possible work practices without specifying a single correct method.

CWA typically consists of five interconnected phases that progressively analyze different constraint types. Through these phases, CWA can describe constraints imposed by the system's purpose, its functional properties, the nature of activities conducted, the roles of different human actors, and their cognitive skills, knowledge, and strategies.

== Methodology ==
Rather than offer a prescribed methodology, the CWA framework instead acts as a toolkit that can be used either individually or in combination with one another, depending upon the analysis needs. These tools are divided between phases. The exact names and scopes of these phases differ slightly dependent on the scope of the analysis. However, the overall scope remains largely the same. As defined by Vicente (1999), the CWA framework comprises five different phases: work domain analysis, control task (or activity) analysis, strategies analysis, social organisation and co-operation analysis, and the Industrial & Organizational Assessment.

Various models can be created based on the different phases of the CWA. A common way to structure the work domain analysis is to create an abstraction hierarchy, which includes identifying the systems purpose, values, functions, and physical objects. The control task analysis can be analyzed from different perspectives. From one perspective, a decision tree can be created based on the various steps an operator in the analyzed systems has to make in their work. From a second perspective, a contextual activity template can be created to analyze which activity is done by an operator at which times. Here, the activities are derived from the abstraction hierarchy from the work domain analysis. In the social organization and co-operation analysis, various identified roles within the system can be mapped on the contextual activity template to see which roles does what activity at which point.

== Application ==
The different tools within the CWA framework have been used for a plethora of different purposes, including system modelling, system design, process design, training needs analysis, training design and evaluation, interface design and evaluation, information requirements specification, tender evaluation, team design, and error management training design. Despite its origin within the nuclear power domain, the CWA applications referred to above have taken place in a wide range of different domains, including naval, military, aviation, driving, and health care domains.

== Research and design aims ==
It is especially difficult to prescribe a strict procedure for the CWA framework. In its true form, the framework is used to provide a description of the constraints within a domain. This description can then be used to address specific research and design aims.

== See also ==
- AcciMap approach – Systems-based technique for accident analysis
- Behavioral systems analysis
- Cognitive systems engineering – Field of study
