= Turkish Airlines Flight 1951 =

2009 aviation accident in the Netherlands

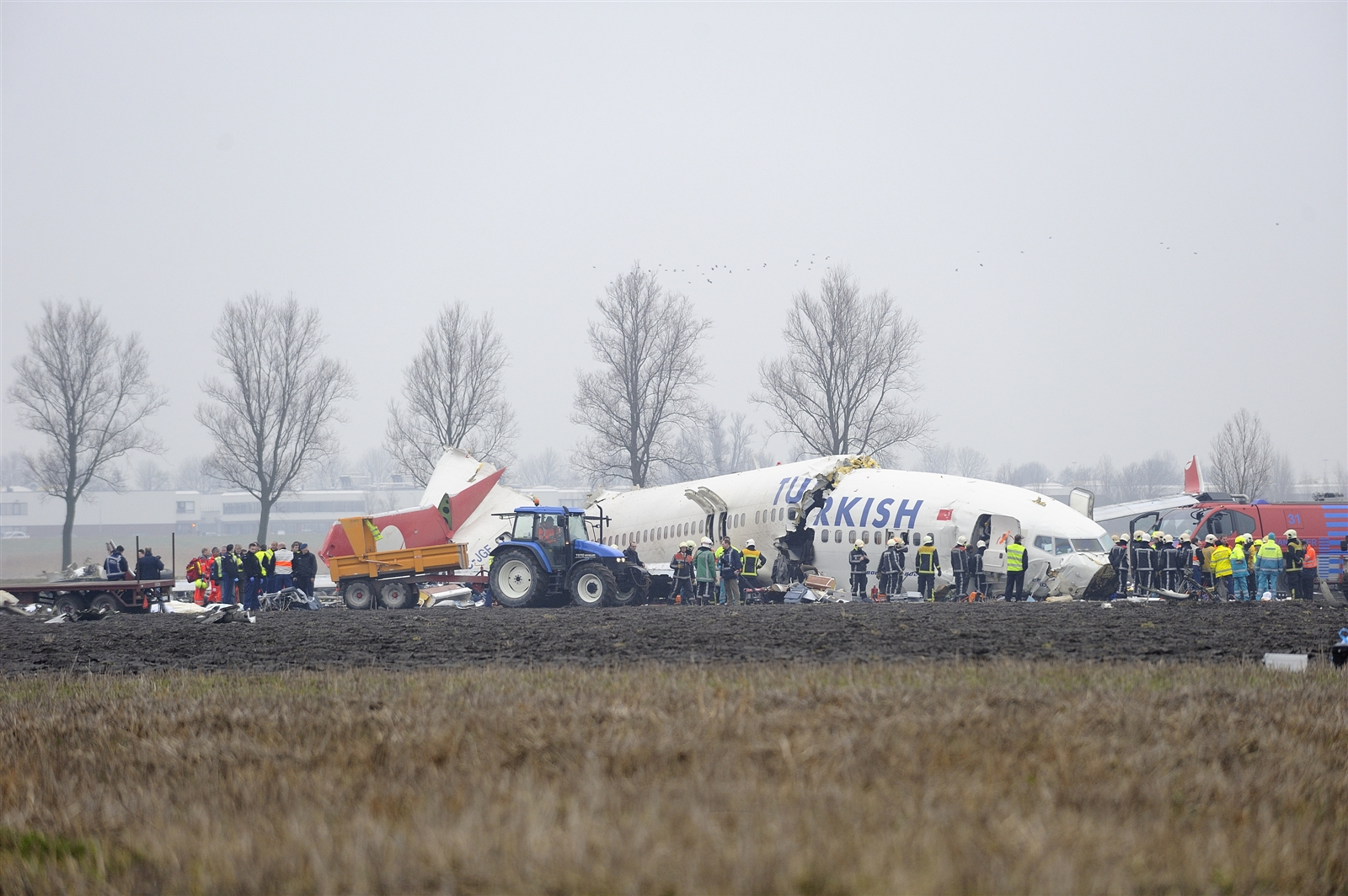
- Wreckage of the aircraft

Accident
- Date: 25 February 2009
- Summary: Stalled and crashed on landing due to faulty radio altimeter and pilot error
- Site: North of the Polderbaan runway (18R/36L), near Amsterdam Schiphol Airport, Amsterdam, Netherlands; 52°22′34″N 4°42′50″E

Aircraft
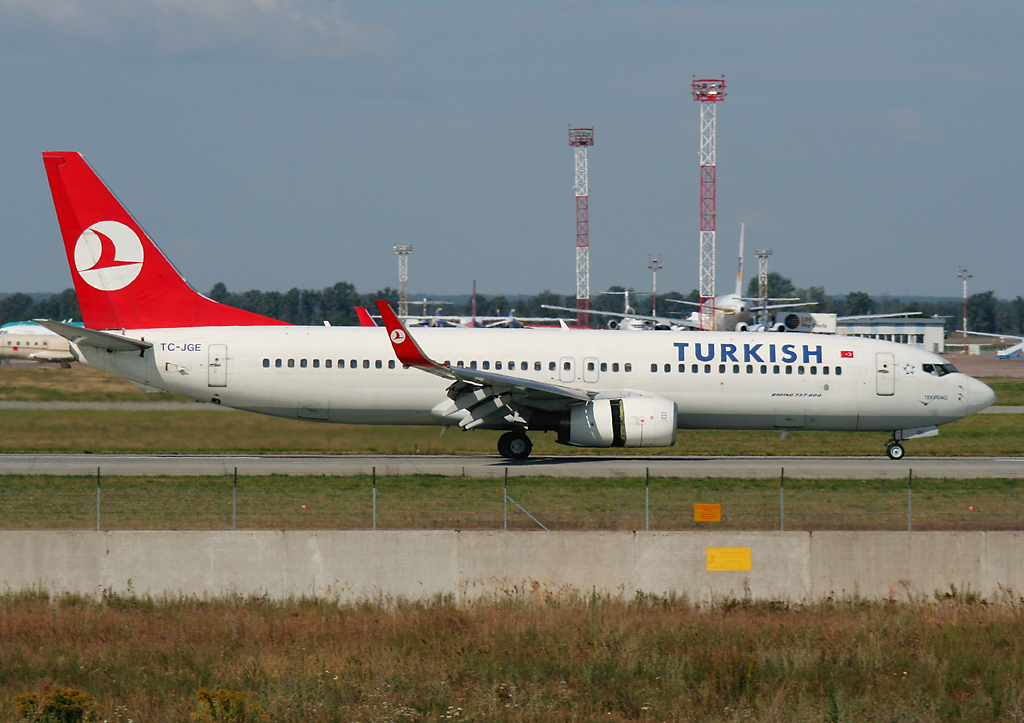
- TC-JGE, the aircraft involved in the accident, pictured in 2008
- Aircraft type: Boeing 737-8F2 (Note: The airliner was a Boeing 737-800 model. Boeing assigns a unique code for each company that buys one of its airliners, which is applied as a suffix to the model number at the time the aircraft is built, hence "737-8F2" designates a 737-800 built for Turkish Airlines (customer code F2).)
- Aircraft name: Tekirdağ
- Operator: Turkish Airlines
- IATA flight No.: TK1951
- ICAO flight No.: THY1951
- Call sign: TURKISH 1951
- Registration: TC-JGE
- Flight origin: Istanbul Atatürk Airport, Istanbul, Turkey
- Destination: Amsterdam Schiphol Airport, Amsterdam, Netherlands
- Occupants: 135
- Passengers: 128
- Crew: 7
- Fatalities: 9
- Injuries: 125
- Survivors: 126

Turkish Airlines Flight 1951 (also known as the Poldercrash or the Schiphol Polderbaan incident) was a passenger flight that crashed during landing at Amsterdam Schiphol Airport, the Netherlands, on 25 February 2009, resulting in the deaths of nine passengers and crew, including all three pilots.

The aircraft, a Turkish Airlines Boeing 737-800, crashed into a field about 1.5 km (0.9 mi) north of the Polderbaan runway (18R), prior to crossing the A9 motorway inbound, at 09:26 UTC (10:26 CET), having flown from Istanbul, Turkey. The aircraft broke into three pieces on impact. The wreckage did not catch fire.

The crash was caused primarily by the aircraft's automated reaction, which was triggered by a faulty radio altimeter. This caused the autothrottle to decrease the engine power to idle during approach. The crew noticed this too late to take appropriate action to increase thrust and recover the aircraft before it stalled and crashed. Boeing has since issued a bulletin to remind pilots of all 737 series and BBJ aircraft of the importance of monitoring airspeed and altitude, advising against the use of autopilot or autothrottle while landing in cases of radio altimeter discrepancies.

A 2020 The New York Times investigation claimed that the Dutch investigation into the crash "either excluded or played down criticisms" of Boeing following pressure from Boeing and US federal safety officials, who instead "emphasized pilot error as a factor ... rather than design flaws."

== Background ==
=== Aircraft ===
The aircraft operating Flight 1951 was a 7-year-old Boeing 737-8F2 with registration TC-JGE, named "Tekirdağ". The airline had 51 aircraft of this model in service at the time of the crash.

=== Flight ===
On board were 128 passengers and seven crew members. The flight was under the command of instructor captain Hasan Tahsin Arısan (aged 54). A former Turkish Air Force fleet commander, Captain Arısan had been working for Turkish Airlines since 1996 and was one of the most experienced pilots at the airline. He had over 5,000 hours of flight time on the F-4E Phantom II. Olgay Özgür (aged 28) was the safety pilot of the flight, a graduate of a flight school in Ankara, who flew the MD-80 for World Focus Airlines before joining Turkish Airlines and passing the 737 type rating in 2006; he was sitting in the cockpit's center jump seat. Murat Sezer (aged 42), under line training, was flying as co-pilot. The cabin crew consisted of Figen Eren, Perihan Özden, Ulvi Murat Eskin, and Yasemin Vural.

== Accident ==
Runway diagram of Schiphol Airport with the Polderbaan runway depicted in black and the location of the crash marked with a red star

The flight was cleared for an approach on runway 18R (also known as the Polderbaan runway), but came down short of the runway threshold, sliding through the wet clay of a plowed field.

The aircraft suffered significant damage. Although the fuselage broke into three pieces, it did not catch fire. Both engines separated and came to rest 100 m (330 ft) from the fuselage.

While several survivors and witnesses indicated that rescuers took 20 to 30 minutes to arrive at the site after the crash, others have stated that the rescuers arrived quickly at the scene. About 60 ambulances arrived along with at least three LifeLiner helicopters (air ambulances, Eurocopter EC135), and a fleet of fire engines. An unconfirmed report by De Telegraaf states that the firefighters were at first given the wrong location for the crash site, delaying their arrival. Lanes of the A4 and A9 motorways were closed to all traffic to allow emergency services to quickly reach the site of the crash.

All three pilots died in the crash. The bodies of the three cockpit crew members were the last to be removed from the plane, at around 20:00. Some of the survivors said that one of the pilots was alive after the crash. The relatives of the passengers on the flight were sent to Amsterdam by Turkish Airlines shortly afterward.

All flights in and out of Schiphol Airport were suspended, according to an airport spokeswoman. Several planes were diverted to Rotterdam The Hague Airport and to Brussels Airport. Around 11:15 UTC (12:15 CET), the Kaagbaan runway (06/24) was reported to have been reopened to air traffic, followed by the Buitenveldertbaan runway (09/27).

Turkish Airlines continues to use the flight number 1951 on its Istanbul-to-Amsterdam route, primarily operated by an Airbus A321neo and an Airbus A330.

== Investigation ==
The investigation was led by the Dutch Safety Board (DSB, Dutch: Onderzoeksraad voor Veiligheid or OVV), and assisted by an expert team from Turkish Airlines and a representative team of the American National Transportation Safety Board (NTSB), accompanied by advisors from Boeing and the Federal Aviation Administration (FAA), Turkish Directorate General of Civil Aviation (SHGM), the operator, the UK Air Accidents Investigation Branch, and the French Bureau of Enquiry and Analysis for Civil Aviation Safety (BEA). The cockpit voice recorder and the flight data recorder were recovered quickly after the crash, after which they were transported to Paris for investigation. The Dutch public prosecution service initially asked the DSB to hand over the black boxes, but the DSB refused to do so. It stated that no indication of homicide, manslaughter, hijacking, or terrorism was present, which would warrant an investigation by the prosecution.

Animated reconstruction of the crash by the Dutch Safety Board

While on final approach for landing, the aircraft was about 2,000 ft (610 m) above ground, when the left-hand (captain's) radio altimeter suddenly changed from 1,950 feet (590 m) to read −8 feet (−2.4 m) altitude, although the right-hand (co-pilot's) radio altimeter functioned correctly. The voice recording showed that the crew was given an audible warning signal (landing gear warning horn) that indicated that the aircraft's landing gear should be down as the aircraft was, according to the captain's radio altimeter, flying too low. This happened several times during the approach to Schiphol. The reason that the captain's radio altimeter was causing further problems was the first officer making a mistake when arming the aircraft's autopilot system for a dual channel ILS (Instrument Landing System) approach.

The Boeing 737NG has two autopilot systems or flight control units (FCU), which can work independently of each other (single channel) or together (dual channel). These systems are called CMD A and CMD B. CMD A is the left-seat FCU (Captain), while CMD B is the right-seat FCU (First Officer). During normal operations, the PF (Pilot Flying) uses their respective FCU. This is referred to as a "single channel". However, if the crew intended to fly an auto-land, which is when the airplane flies the approach and landing itself (during a CAT III ILS Approach), one would engage both FCUs; this way the approach can be flown to greater precision in bad visibility, allowing the pilots to lower the MDA (Minimum Decision Altitude) to 50 ft. This is called a "dual channel". Turkish Airlines' standard operating procedure at the time stated that all approaches should be flown "dual channel" when available, but the inexperienced (on the 737NG) first officer forgot to arm approach mode in the aircraft's mode control panel (MCP) before he engaged CMD A to make the approach "dual channel", meaning that the aircraft thought the pilots wanted to do a single-channel approach using CMD A (captain's autopilot) only. However unbeknownst to the pilots CMD A had a radio altimeter fail, which would be the main contributor to the accident. Later, the safety board's preliminary report indicated that the flight data recorder history of the captain's radio altimeter showed 8191 feet (the maximum possible recorded) until the aircraft descended through 1950, then suddenly showed -8 feet.

The throttles were pulled back to idle thrust to slow the aircraft to descend and acquire the glideslope. However, the autothrottle unexpectedly switched to "retard mode", a setting designed to reduce thrust to idle at 27 ft (8.2 m) above the runway, just before touchdown. In this mode, the autothrottle holds the thrust at idle, overriding any subsequent manual adjustments by the pilots. At 144 knots (267 km/h; 166 mph), the pilots manually increased thrust to sustain that speed, but the autothrottle immediately returned the thrust lever to idle power because the first officer did not hold the throttle lever in position. The throttles remained at idle for about 100 seconds while the aircraft slowed to 83 knots (154 km/h; 96 mph), 40 knots (74 km/h; 46 mph) below the reference speed as the aircraft descended below the required altitude to stay on the glideslope. The stick-shaker activated about 150 m (490 ft) above the ground, indicating an imminent stall, the autothrottle advanced thrust, and the captain attempted to apply full power. The engines responded, but not enough altitude or forward airspeed was available to recover, and the aircraft hit the ground tail first at 95 knots (176 km/h; 109 mph).

The data from the flight recorder also showed that the same altimeter problem had happened twice during the previous eight landings, but that on both occasions, the crew had taken the correct action by disengaging the autothrottle and manually increasing the thrust. Investigations were instigated to determine why more action had not been taken after the altimeter problem was detected. In response to the preliminary conclusions, Boeing issued a bulletin, Multi-Operator Message (MOM) 09-0063-01B, to remind pilots of all 737 series and Boeing Business Jet (BBJ) aircraft of the importance of monitoring airspeed and altitude (the "primary flight instruments"), advising against the use of autopilot or autothrottle while landing in cases of radio altimeter discrepancies. Following the release of the preliminary report, Dutch and international press concluded that pilot inattention caused the accident, though several Turkish news publications still emphasized other possible causes.

On 9 March 2009, recovery of the wreckage started. All parts of the plane were moved to an East Schiphol hangar.

It was reported that the first officer survived the crash itself, but that rescuers were unable to reach him via the cockpit door, owing to security measures introduced in the wake of the September 11, 2001 attacks, including reinforced cockpit doors. The rescuers eventually cut their way into the cockpit through the roof, by which time the first officer had died.

Seat map showing injuries and deaths

The final report was released on 6 May 2010. The DSB stated that the approach was not stabilized; hence, the crew ought to have initiated a go-around. The autopilot followed the glide slope, while the autothrottle reduced thrust to idle, owing to a faulty radio altimeter showing an incorrect altitude. This caused the airspeed to drop and the pitch attitude to increase; all this went unnoticed by the crew until the stick-shaker activated. Prior to this, air traffic control advised the crew to intercept the glide slope from above; this obscured the erroneous autothrottle mode and increased the crew's workload. The subsequent approach to stall recovery procedure was not executed properly, causing the aircraft to stall and crash. Turkish Airlines disputed the crash inquiry findings on stall recovery.

== Passengers ==
Nationality	Passengers			Crew			Total		
Nationality	Total	Killed	Survived	Total	Killed	Survived	Total	Killed	Survived
Bulgaria	1	0	1	0	0	0	1	0	1
Germany	1	0	1	0	0	0	1	0	1
Italy	1	0	1	0	0	0	1	0	1
Netherlands	53	0	53	0	0	0	53	0	53
Taiwan	1	0	1	0	0	0	1	0	1
Turkey	51	1	50	7	4	3	58	5	53
United Kingdom	3	0	3	0	0	0	3	0	3
United States	7	4	3	0	0	0	7	4	3
Total	118	5	113	7	4	3	125	9	116

Nine fatalities and a total of 125 injuries occurred, with 11 of them serious. Five of the deceased were Turkish citizens, including the captain, the first officer, a line-training pilot, and one member of the cabin crew. Four were Americans, of whom three were identified as Boeing employees stationed in Ankara and working on an Airborne Early Warning and Control program for the Turkish military. One passenger was uninjured.

The plane carried 53 passengers from the Netherlands, 51 from Turkey, seven from the United States, three from the United Kingdom and one each from Germany, Bulgaria, Italy, and Taiwan.

== Confidential information onboard ==
Following media speculation, a spokesperson for the prosecutor's office in Haarlem confirmed in April 2009 to Agence France-Presse that instructions were given following the crash to remove four Boeing laptops from the wreckage, and that the laptops were handed over to the US embassy in The Hague. According to Dutch newspaper De Telegraaf, the Boeing employees on board were in possession of confidential military information.

Turkish media outlets Radikal and Sözcü also reported that the Boeing employees on board were in possession of confidential military information, and that the rescue response was delayed because American officials had specifically requested from Dutch authorities that no one was to approach the wreckage until after the confidential information was retrieved.

According to Radikal, the then-CEO of Turkish Airlines, Temel Kotil, had also stated that a Turkish Airlines employee stationed at Schiphol Airport had arrived at the crash site with his apron-access airport identification, but was prevented from reaching the wreckage, and was handcuffed and detained by Dutch authorities after resisting.

While the De Telegraaf article and some Turkish sources allege that U.S. Federal Bureau of Investigation or Central Intelligence Agency agents were on-site for recovery, this was denied by the prosecutor's office.

== Boeing and NTSB pushback ==
An investigation by The New York Times' Chris Hamby published in January 2020 in the aftermath of the Boeing 737 MAX groundings claimed that the DSB "either excluded or played down criticisms of the manufacturer in its 2010 final report after pushback from a team of Americans that included Boeing and federal safety officials...who said that certain pilot errors had not been 'properly emphasized'". The Hamby article draws on a 2009 human factors analysis by Sidney Dekker, which was not published publicly by the DSB until after The New York Times investigation was published.

In February 2020, it was reported that Boeing had refused to cooperate with a new Dutch review on the crash investigation and that the NTSB had also refused a request from Dutch lawmakers to participate.

== In media ==
The Discovery Channel Canada / National Geographic TV series Mayday featured the crash and investigation in a season-10 episode titled "Who's in Control?".

The episode is dramatized in the episode "Who’s Flying" of Why Planes Crash.

== Gallery ==
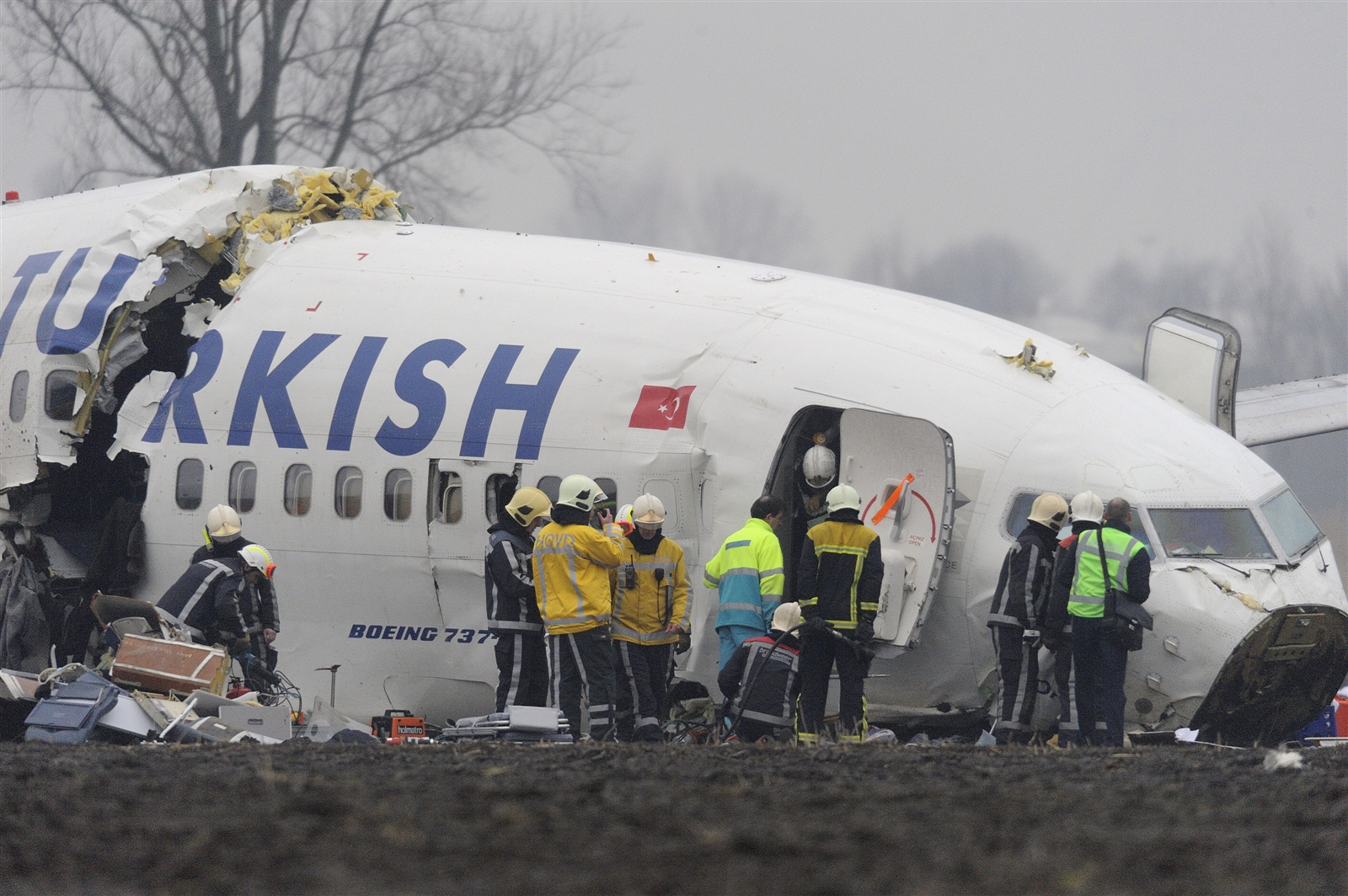
The wreckage of the cockpit of Turkish Airlines Flight 1951

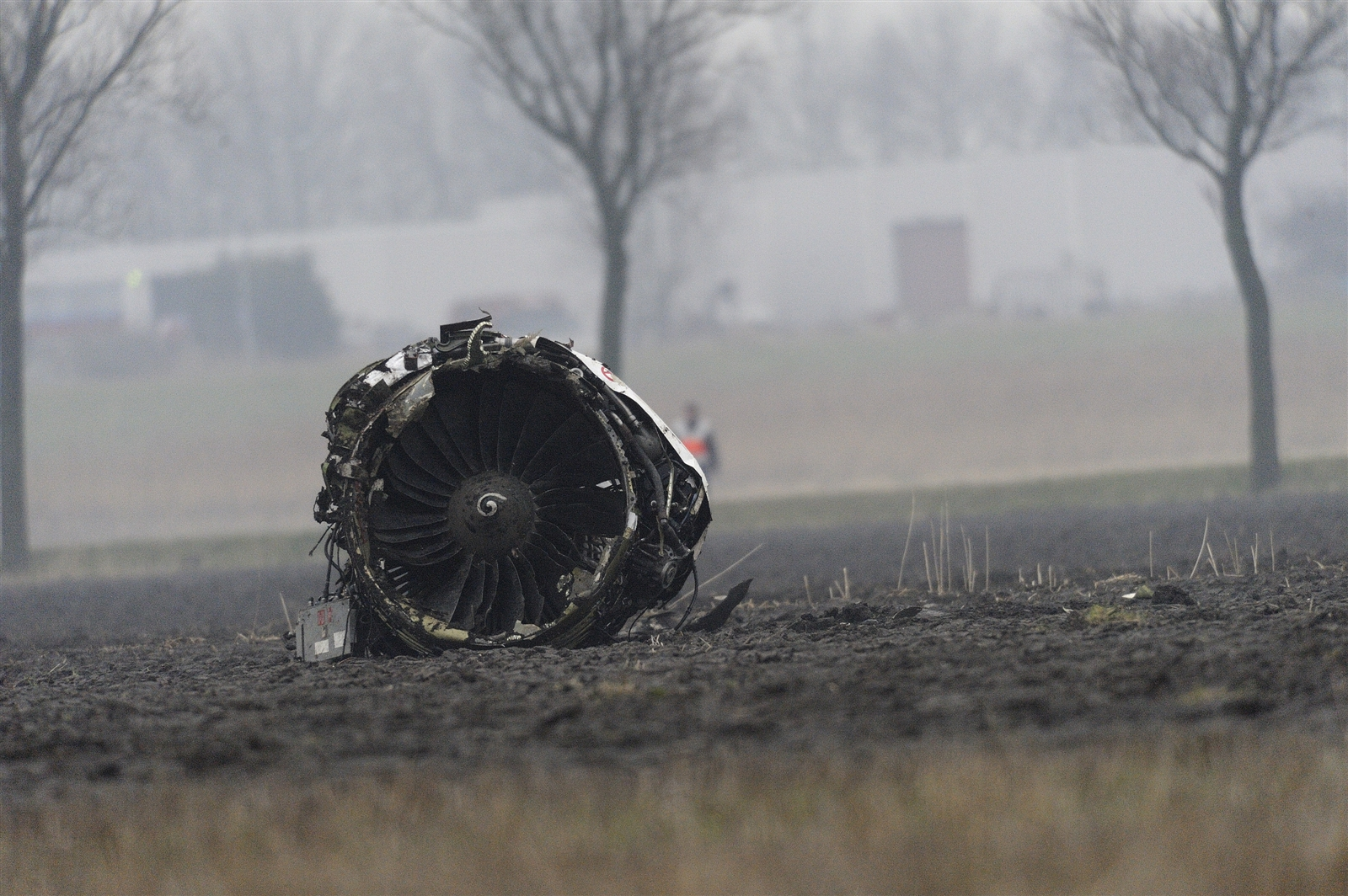
Both jet engines separated, coming to rest 100 m (330 ft) from the fuselage

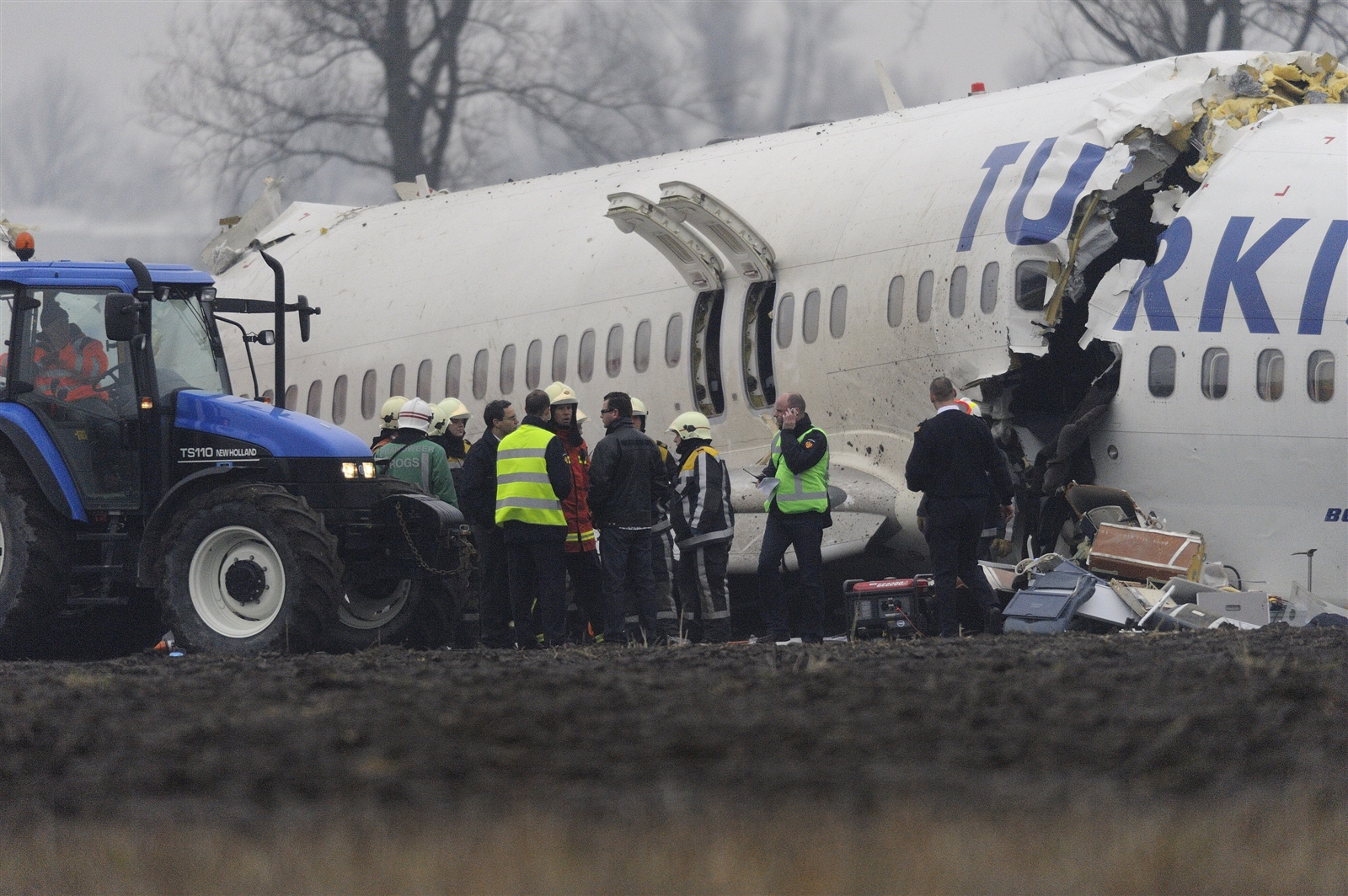
Rescuers at the scene

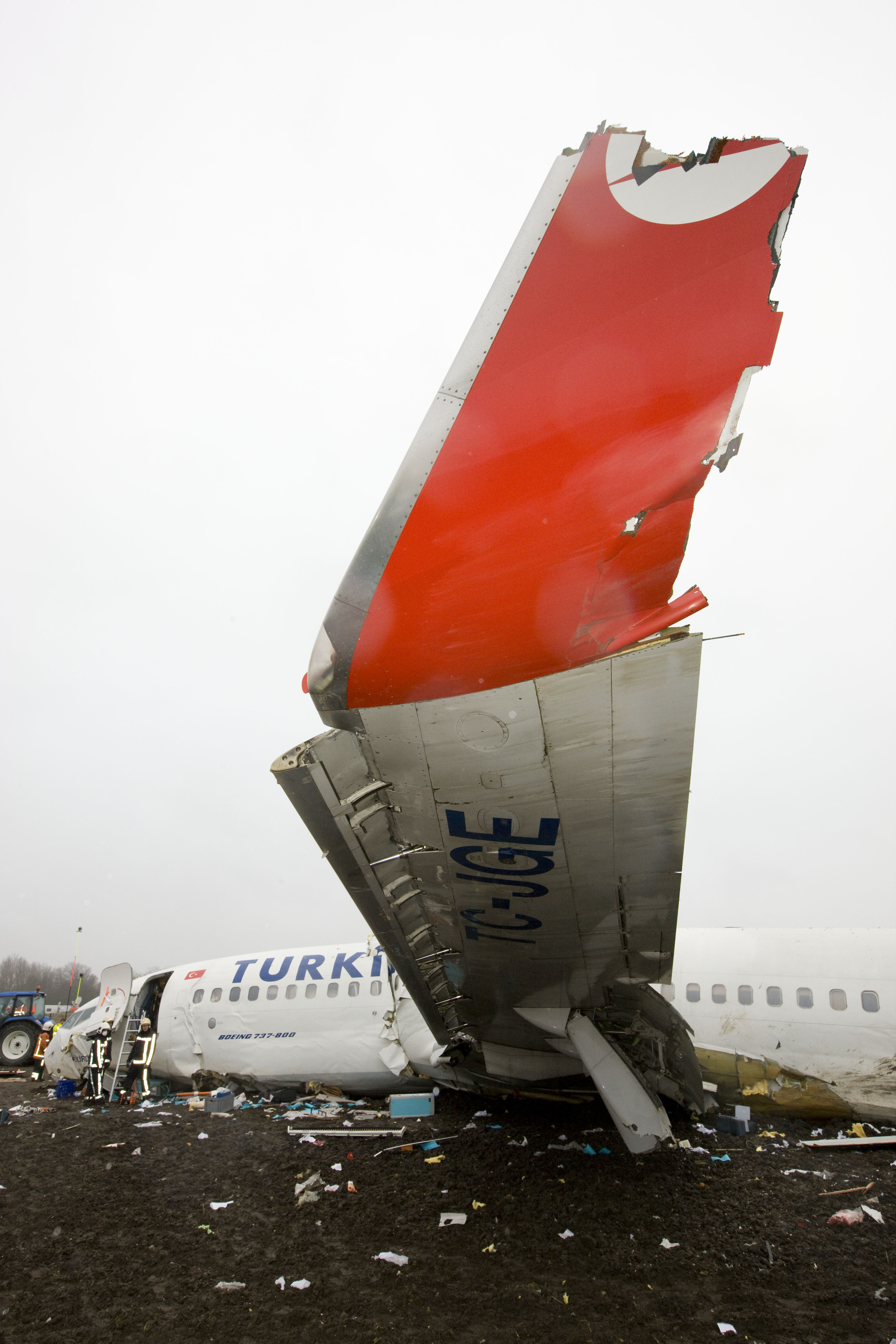
The left wing of the aircraft

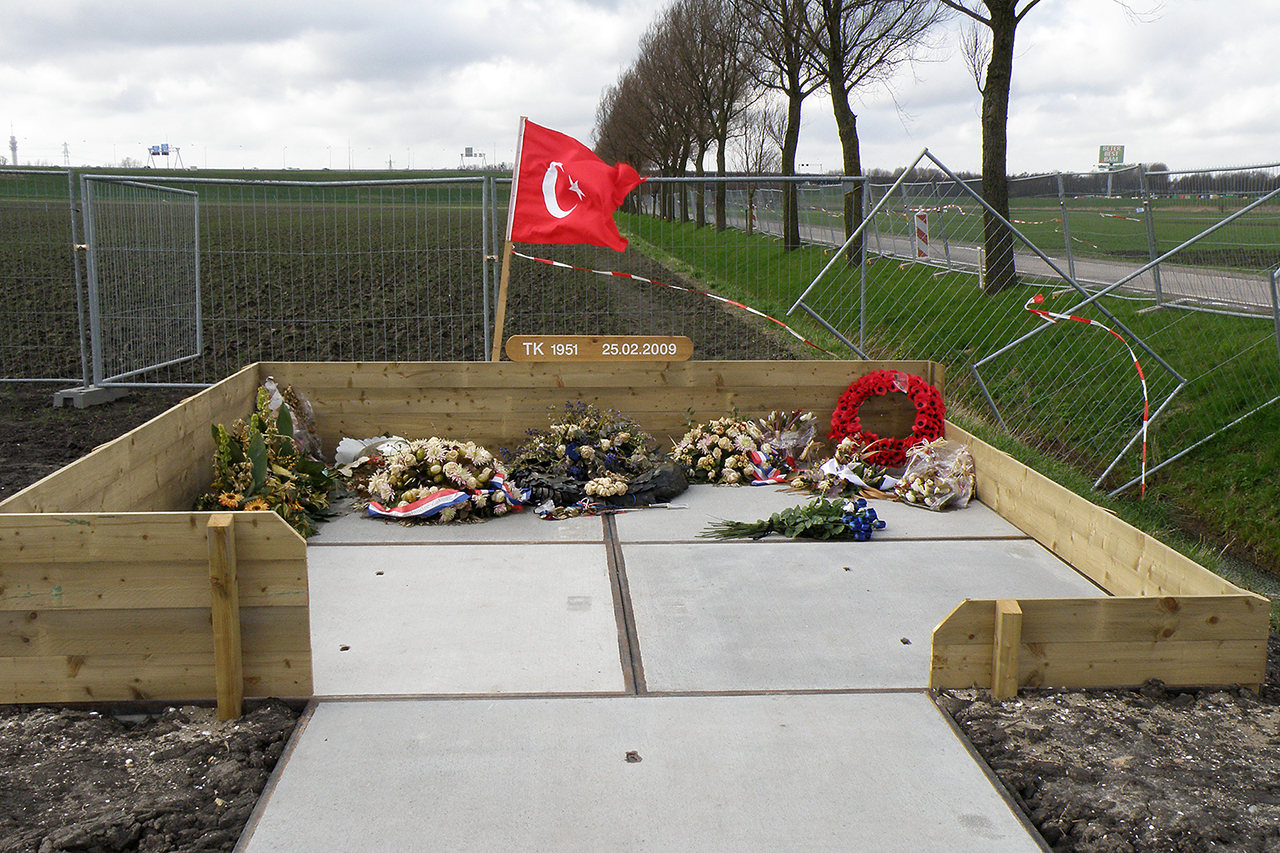
Temporary memorial near the crash site
