= To err is human =

To err is human may refer to:

- "To err is human, to forgive divine" a quote from Alexander Pope's poem An Essay on Criticism
- Errare humanum est, a Latin proverb
- To Err Is Human (report), a 1999 report on U.S. medical errors
- Irren ist männlich, 1996 German film
