= Robert Wears =

American physician

Robert L. Wears
- Born: 1947
- Died: July 15, 2017 (aged 69–70)
- Education: Johns Hopkins University; University of North Florida; Mines Paris - PSL
- Scientific career
- Fields: emergency medicine, patient safety
- Workplaces: University of Florida
- Thesis: Resilience Dynamics in Uncertain, High Tempo, High Stakes Settings (2011)

Robert L. Wears (1947 – July 15, 2017) was an American medical doctor, professor of emergency medicine, and safety researcher who integrated human factors in healthcare, doing studies of technical work in complex socio-technical systems, joint and distributed cognitive systems, and the impact of information technology on safety and resilient performance.

Described as one of the country's leading experts in patient safety and emergency medicine, Wears published over 400 articles, books, and book chapters related to patient safety, resilient health care, and emergency medicine.

There are two safety awards named in his honor: The Robert L. Wears Early Career Award offered by the Human Factors and Ergonomics Society, and the Robert L. Wears Patient Safety Leadership Award offered by Jacksonville University.

== Biography ==
Wears graduated from Johns Hopkins University in 1969 with a BA in liberal arts. After completing his degree, he enrolled in the Johns Hopkins School of Medicine, completing his medical degree in 1973. He did his residency at the University Hospital of Jacksonville, where he served as chief resident in 1978.

In 1979, Wears left his residency at the University Hospital to form a group of board-certified emergency physicians, which was the year that the American Board of Emergency Medicine first received approval.

In 1986, Wears took a faculty position as a professor in the department of emergency medicine at the University of Florida College of Medicine – Jacksonville.

In 1995, Wears earned a master's degree in computer science from the University of North Florida, and in 2011 he obtained his PhD in industrial safety from the Ecole Nationale Superior des Mines de Paris Centre de Recherché sur les Risques et les Crises, graduating with honors. His PhD thesis was titled Resilience Dynamics in Uncertain, High Tempo, High Stakes Settings.

In 2013, Wears was appointed to a three-year term as a University of Florida Research Foundation professor.

In 2014, Wears received an honorary five-year appointment from the University of Southern Denmark.

Wears was a member of multiple professional societies and organizations, including the National Center for Human Factors in Healthcare, and served on the board of directors for the Emergency Medicine Patient Safety Foundation. He served on the editorial board of the Annals of Emergency Medicine from 1990 through his death, and the journal maintains a web page with a collection of his editorials. He was a Life Fellow of this American College of Emergency Physicians.
