= Jeffrey Braithwaite =

Australian academic

Jeffrey Braithwaite is an Australian health services researcher, academic, and author. He holds academic appointments as Professor of Health Systems Research at Macquarie University and Founding Director of the Australian Institute of Health Innovation (AIHI).

Braithwaite has held senior leadership roles in international organisations focused on healthcare quality and safety, including serving as President of the International Society for Quality in Health Care (ISQua) from 2020 to 2023. He has collaborated with organisations including the World Health Organization (WHO) and the Organisation for Economic Co-operation and Development (OECD) on health systems research and policy initiatives.

Braithwaite's research has been included in international citation-based rankings of researchers in health and social sciences. According to Google Scholar, his publications have received more than 50,000 citations.

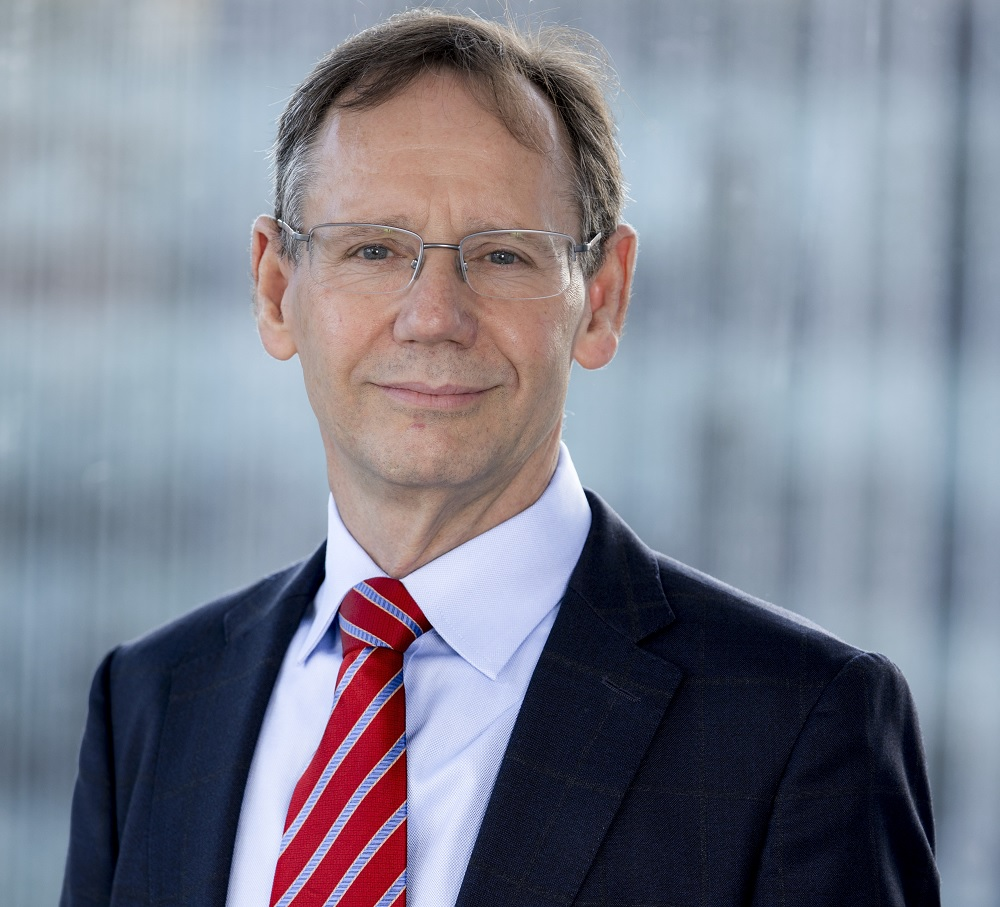
Jeffrey Braithwaite

== Early life and education ==
Jeffrey Braithwaite completed a Graduate Diploma in Labour Relations and the Law at the University of Sydney in 1980. He later completed a Bachelor of Arts at the University of New England in 1988, majoring in psychology, prehistory and history, with minors in philosophy and archaeology.

In 1995, he completed a Master of Industrial Relations (First Class Honours) at the University of Sydney. His honours thesis examined the nature, quality and characteristics of industrial relations in healthcare workplaces.

In 1996, Braithwaite completed a Master of Business Administration at Macquarie University, where he received the Allen Knott Scholar Award, graduated as medallist, and received first prize in industrial relations.

He was awarded a Doctor of Philosophy from the University of New South Wales in 2000. His doctoral thesis, Incorporating medical clinicians into management: an examination of clinical directorates, examined the integration of medical clinicians into healthcare management structures.

== Career ==
=== Health service management ===
Before entering full-time academia, Braithwaite worked in senior management roles within the Australian health sector. Between 1986 and 1994 he held executive positions at St Vincent's Hospital Sydney, including Director of Corporate and Strategic Planning, Director of Corporate Services, and Human Resources Director. Earlier appointments included senior human resource management roles within the New South Wales public health system.

=== Academic career ===
Braithwaite joined the University of New South Wales in 1994, initially as a Senior Lecturer in the School of Health Services Management. He subsequently served as Director of several postgraduate health management programs, Head of the School of Health Services Management, Associate Professor, and later Professor.

In 2001 he established what later became the Centre for Healthcare Resilience and Implementation Science. In 2007, with colleagues, he founded the Australian Institute of Health Innovation (AIHI) at University of New South Wales, a multidisciplinary research institute focused on health systems, healthcare quality, patient safety, and implementation science.

In 2014 Braithwaite moved to Macquarie University, where he became Professor of Health Systems Research and continued as Founding Director of AIHI and Director of the Centre for Healthcare Resilience and Implementation Science.

=== International leadership ===
Braithwaite has held visiting, honorary, adjunct, and advisory appointments at universities and organisations in Australia, Europe, Asia, and North America. These have included appointments at Newcastle University, the University of Birmingham (UK), the University of Stavanger (Norway), the University of Southern Denmark (Denmark), and the University of New South Wales.

He has also advised and collaborated with international organisations including the World Health Organization (WHO), the Organisation for Economic Co-operation and Development (OECD), and the International Society for Quality in Health Care (ISQua).

From 2020 to 2023 he served as President of ISQua, later becoming Immediate Past President and subsequently Chair of the International Academy of Quality and Safety. In 2025 he joined the United States’ National Academy of Medicine Steering Group on Patient Safety in the Era of Artificial Intelligence and the Joint Commission International's Global Patient Safety Leadership Council.

=== Research ===
Braithwaite's research examines how health systems can improve safety, quality, resilience, and organisational performance. His work has addressed healthcare accreditation, implementation science, organisational culture, clinician leadership, patient safety, learning health systems, resilience in healthcare, and large-scale health system transformation.

His research has examined healthcare reform, organisational change, interdisciplinary collaboration, and health system governance. His research has also explored complexity science and its application to healthcare delivery.

Braithwaite has led large research programs funded by Australian and international agencies and has supervised numerous doctoral and postdoctoral researchers. He has published in health policy, management, quality and safety, and implementation science journals.

=== Publications and scholarly impact ===
Braithwaite is one of Australia's most prolific health services researchers. As of 2026, publication databases listed more than 1,600 works authored or co-authored by Braithwaite.

His work has appeared in journals such as The New England Journal of Medicine, The Lancet, BMJ, BMJ Quality & Safety, Social Science & Medicine, International Journal for Quality in Health Care, and Health Research Policy and Systems.

Since 2022 he has been listed among Stanford University's World's Top 2% of Scientists. In 2024 he was ranked among the leading Social Sciences and Humanities researchers globally by Research.com, which placed him 15th in Australia and 228th worldwide in the discipline.

== Honours and recognition ==
Braithwaite has received a wide range of national and international awards and honours for research excellence, teaching, leadership, and service to healthcare over his career.

Among his major honours are:

- President's Award, International Society for Quality in Health Care (ISQua), recognising 20 years of service (2025)
- Member at Large, Sigma Xi, The Scientific Research Honor Society (2024)
- Research.com ranking of 15th in Australia and 228th globally in Social Sciences and Humanities (2024)
- Sidney Sax Medal for contributions to Australian healthcare policy, organisation, delivery, and research (2021)
- Fellow of the Australian Academy of Health and Medical Sciences (2017)
- Fellow of the Academy of Social Sciences, United Kingdom (2015)
- Health Services Researcher of the Year, Research Australia (2015)
- Fellow of the Faculty of Public Health of the Royal Colleges of Physicians, United Kingdom (2014)
- Vice-Chancellor's Award for Excellence in Postgraduate Research Supervision, University of New South Wales (2013)
- Australian Council on Healthcare Standards Medal (2011)

== Professional affiliations ==
Braithwaite is a Fellow of the Australian Academy of Health and Medical Sciences (FAAHMS), the Academy of Social Sciences (United Kingdom) (FAcSS), the Faculty of Public Health of the Royal Colleges of Physicians (United Kingdom) (FFPHRCP), the Australasian College of Health Service Management (FCHSM), and the Institute of Managers and Leaders Australia and New Zealand (FIML). He has served on governmental, professional and academic advisory bodies in Australia and internationally, particularly in the fields of healthcare quality, patient safety, implementation science and health system reform.

== Selected works ==
Journal Articles

- Braithwaite J, Glasziou P, Westbrook JI. The three numbers you need to know about healthcare: the 60-30-10 challenge. BMC Med. 2020;18(1):102. doi:10.1186/s12916-020-01563-4
- Braithwaite J, Mannion R, Matsuyama Y, Shekelle PG, et al. The future of health systems to 2030: a roadmap for global progress and sustainability. Int J Qual Health Care. 2018;30(10):823–831. doi:10.1093/intqhc/mzy242
- Braithwaite J, Churruca K, Long JC, Ellis LA, Herkes J. When complexity science meets implementation science: a theoretical and empirical analysis of systems change. BMC Med. 2018;16(1):63. doi:10.1186/s12916-018-1057-z
- Runciman WB, Hunt TD, Hannaford NA, Hibbert PD, Westbrook JI, Coiera EW, Day RO, Hindmarsh DM, McGlynn EA, Braithwaite J. CareTrack: Assessing the appropriateness of health care delivery in Australia. Med J Aust. 2012;197(2):100–105. doi:10.5694/mja12.10510
- Braithwaite J, Wears RL, Hollnagel E. Resilient health care: turning patient safety on its head. Int J Qual Health Care. 2015;27(5):418–420. doi:10.1093/intqhc/mzv063
- Braithwaite J. Changing how we think about healthcare improvement. BMJ. 2018;361:k2014. doi:10.1136/bmj.k2014

Books

- Braithwaite J, Zurynski Y, Smith CL, editors. Routledge Handbook on Climate Change and Health System Sustainability. Abingdon (UK): Routledge; 2024. ISBN 9781032410654
- Rapport F, Clay-Williams R, Braithwaite J. Implementation science: the key concepts. Abingdon, Oxon: Routledge, 2022. ISBN 9780367626112
- Hollnagel E, Braithwaite J, Wears RL, editors. Resilient Health Care. Boca Raton, FL: CRC Press, Taylor & Francis Group; 2019. doi:10.1201/9781315605722
- Braithwaite J, Mannion R, Matsuyama Y, Shekelle P, Whittaker S, Al-Adawi S, editors. Health Systems Improvement Across the Globe: Success Stories from 60 Countries. Boca Raton (FL): CRC Press; 2018. ISBN 9781472482044
