= Exogeny =

Fact of an action or object originating externally

In a variety of contexts, exogeny or exogeneity (from Greek ἔξω éxō 'outside' and -γένεια -géneia 'to produce') is the fact of an action or object originating externally. It is the opposite of endogeneity or endogeny, the fact of being influenced from within a system.

== Economics ==
In an economic model, an exogenous change is one that comes from outside the model and is unexplained by the model. Such changes of an economic model from outside factors can include the influence of technology, in which this had previously been noted as an exogenous factor, but has rather been noted as a factor that can depict economic forces as a whole. In economic sociology, Project IDEA (Interdisciplinary Dimensions of Economic Analysis) gave notion to understanding the exogenous factors that play a role within economic theory. Developed from the International Social Science Council (ISSC) in the year of 1982, Project IDEA was founded to gather ideas from economists and sociologists in order to conceptualize what economic sociology incorporates, as they have sought to understand why these two fields have been estranged from each other. Such exogenous factors in economic theory include laws placed in economic systems by governments, ranks of social classes in populations, and preferences based on social factors of an individual.

=== Exogenous factors in econometrics ===
In econometrics, an endogenous random variable is correlated with the error term in the econometric model, while an exogenous variable is not. However, exogenous variables aid in the explanation of endogenous variable variances. In the preset group, it is typical to include historical values of endogenous variables. Exogenous variables are independent of the model's disturbance term, since they are preset. They meet the same conditions as explanatory variables do in a traditional regression model.

== Biology and medicine ==
=== Biology ===
An exogenous contrast agent, in medical imaging for example, is a liquid injected into the patient intravenously that enhances visibility of a pathology, such as a tumor. An exogenous factor is any material that is present and active in an individual organism or living cell but that originated outside that organism, as opposed to an endogenous factor.

In the origins of diseases, exogenous factors, namely those that are factors in inflammation or stress (such as overexertion, overeating, and extreme feelings of emotions of grief or anger), all contribute to exhaustion or modifications in genes. An accumulation of such stressors affect the immune system by disrupting the amount of communication that occurs between the immune system and other areas of the body.

DNA introduced to cells via transfection or viral transduction is an exogenous factor. Exogenous factors in DNA, particularly DNA damage, are more known as environmental factors that cause progression in the impairment of DNA. Such exogenous factors would be different chemical agents, ionizing radiation (IR), and ultraviolet radiation (UV). These factors penetrate the deeper layers of the cell, causing great damage, with either apoptosis or senescence occurring, further leading to arrested or altered development and aging of the organism causing neurological disorders and cancer.

=== Medicine and medical treatments ===
In medicine, exogenous factors are seen in both pathogens and therapeutics. Exogenous factors can be included in the type of obesity where there is an imbalance of food and metabolism, in which one consumes a much greater amount than the human body can handle. On the opposite end, endogenous obesity refers to obesity caused by disorders or issues outside an imbalance of food intake itself, which include genetic disorders, interruption of thyroid functions, and other syndromic disorders.

In relation to cancer, carcinogens are exogenous factors, in which these are made up of various factors (chemical, biological, physical), causing cancer after having entering through several routes of the body.

== Social sciences ==
=== Philosophy ===
In philosophy, the origins of existence of self, or the identity of self, emanating from, or sustaining, outside the natural or influenced realm, are exogenous.

=== Psychology ===
Exogenous constructivism prioritizes the reconstruction of structures that have already been created in the environment, which is based from a mechanical metaphor, and greatly reflects off of Bandura's social learning theory. Overall, exogenous constructivism is noted to assume that knowledge comes from an individual's environment, which is assumed to be learned. Because an active individual is expected to be participating in the abstraction of knowledge from its environment, practical guidance of this result of participation remains the most crucial feature of directing the learning process. The structure of the individual's operating environment has a substantial impact on the structure of the knowledge generated. Through the perspective of Piaget, learning was known as the individual's former structures accommodated to those imposed by its current environment. The individual's accommodation is directed by the environment, which provides the structures to which the individual must adapt.

In attentional psychology, exogenous stimuli are external stimuli without conscious intention. An example of this is attention drawn to a flashing light in the periphery of vision.

== Exogeny in other areas ==
=== Geography ===
In geography, exogenous processes, unlike endogenic processes, originate from external forces acting on the Earth and other planetary bodies, rather than from internal geological activity. Weathering, erosion, transportation and sedimentation are the main exogenous processes. Asides from climate, exogenous geographic factors are able to contribute to the overall process of distribution, including densities of populations and urbanizations of certain areas in the world. Exogeneity is proposed to ultimately cause geographic considerations to be rejected.

=== Ludology ===
In ludology, the study of games, an exogenous item is anything outside the game itself. Therefore, an item in a massively multiplayer online game would have exogenous value if people were buying it with real world money rather than in-game currency (though its in-game cost would be endogenous). Noted as exogenous fantasy, one may also refer to this term as extrinsic stimuli or "fantasy"; these describe a "fantasy" (game) that solely relies on the skill being mastered, rather than the other way around. These fantasies also tend to possess a few characteristics, such as (1) understanding that the fantasy and the skill that is being learned are inextricably linked, (2) the fantasy context and the instructional content being provided have an intrinsic and continuous link, and (3) endogenous fantasies tend to include more intellectually challenging and captivating content compared to exogenous fantasies.

=== Materials science ===
In materials science, an exogenous property of a substance is derived from outside or external influences, such as a nano-doped material.
