= Erik Hollnagel =

Safety researcher

Erik Hollnagel is a Danish safety researcher who worked in multiple domains, including aviation and health care. He has worked in the fields of cognitive systems engineering and resilience engineering.

== Research ==
Hollnagel proposed a new perspective on safety which he referred to as Safety-II, which he contrasted with the traditional perspective, which he referred to as Safety-I

Hollnagel used the term "ETTO Principle" to describe a fundamental tradeoff involved in work between being efficient and being thorough, hence the Efficiency-Thoroughness Tradeoff (ETTO)

The Functional Resonance Analysis Method (FRAM) is a technique developed by Hollnagel for modeling how accidents can occur in complex systems

=== Resilience potentials ===
In the field of resilience engineering, Hollnagel characterized resilient systems as those which possessed the following four resilience potentials

1. responding to threats (including readiness to respond)
2. monitoring in a flexible way
3. anticipating threats and opportunities
4. learning from experience

Hollnagel proposed an approach for measuring these potentials, which was initially referred to as the Resilience Assessment Grid (RAG), and was later renamed to Systemic Potentials Management (SPM)

== Books ==
- Human reliability analysis: Context and control (1993)
- Cognitive Reliability and Error Analysis Method (CREAM) (1998)
- Barriers and accident prevention (2004)
- Joint cognitive systems: Foundations of cognitive systems engineering (2005)
- Joint cognitive systems: Patterns in cognitive systems. (2006)
- The ETTO principle: Why things that go right sometimes go wrong (2009)
- The Functional Resonance Analysis Method: Modelling complex socio-technical systems (2012)
- Safety-I and Safety-II: The past and future of safety management (2014)
- Safety-II in practice (2017)
- Synesis: The unification of productivity, quality, safety and reliability (2020)
