= Work domain analysis =

Work Domain Analysis (WDA) is the foundational first phase of the Cognitive Work Analysis (CWA) framework used in systems engineering and human factors research. It provides a structured method for describing the functional constraints that govern the purpose, priorities, and operations of sociotechnical systems under analysis. Developed by Jens Rasmussen and colleagues at Risø National Laboratory in Denmark, WDA serves as an essential foundation for subsequent phases of CWA by establishing a representation of the functional structure of the work environment independent of specific tasks, activities, or worker roles.

The primary framework used in WDA is the Abstraction-Decomposition Space (ADS), which maps the work domain across multiple levels of abstraction (from functional purpose to physical form) and decomposition (from whole system to individual components). This representation captures both the means-ends relationships (connecting higher-level purposes to lower-level functions and physical resources) and part-whole relationships (connecting system elements at different levels of granularity).

Unlike traditional task analysis methods that focus on specific sequences of actions, WDA emphasizes understanding the fundamental constraints and possibilities within the work environment that shape potential actions. This approach makes WDA particularly valuable for analyzing complex, dynamic systems where workers must adapt to changing conditions, making decisions based on the functional properties and constraints of their work domain rather than following predetermined procedures.

== Components ==
=== Abstraction Hierarchy ===
The Abstraction Hierarchy (AH) is a core component of the WDA, providing a task- and actor-independent representation of the functional structure of a work domain. Originally developed by Rasmussen (1985), the AH is designed to capture the invariant constraints of a work system independent of specific tasks, events, or operator strategies. This distinguishes it from traditional task analysis methods that focus on particular sequences of actions.

The AH organizes the work domain across five levels of abstraction, forming a means-ends hierarchy. Higher levels represent the “why” (purposes and priorities), middle levels reflect the “what” (functions and processes), and lower levels detail the “how” (physical resources and configurations). This structure supports both top-down (goal-driven) and bottom-up (resource-driven) reasoning.

The five standard levels are:

- Functional Purpose (FP): The overall goals, purposes, and values the system is intended to fulfill. These purposes are enduring and situation-independent, defining the system's ultimate objectives regardless of specific circumstances or temporal factors.
- Abstract Function (AF): Governing principles, such as priorities or physical laws, that constrain system operation. These often include competing values that must be balanced (e.g., safety vs. efficiency, quality vs. cost).
- Generalized Function (GF): The general functions and processes required to fulfill system purposes, while operating within the constraints of the abstract functions.
- Physical Function (PFn): The capabilities and behaviors of specific components. These functions are expressed in generic, purpose-independent terms that represent what the physical objects can do regardless of their specific application in the domain.
- Physical Form (PFo): The appearance, layout, and physical configuration of system elements. While this level is purpose-independent, analyst judgment is required to identify and include only those physical elements relevant to the analysis, keeping the representation at a manageable level of detail.

The exact terminology for these levels may vary across different applications and analysts. For example, Xiao et al. use alternative terminology while preserving the same structural relationships.

=== Abstraction-Decomposition Space (ADS) ===
When the Abstraction Hierarchy is combined with a decomposition axis—showing whole-part relationships from system to subsystems to components—it forms the Abstraction-Decomposition Space (ADS). This two-dimensional matrix represents each element of the work domain in terms of both its level of abstraction and level of system decomposition.

== Applying the framework ==
Developing an AH typically involves:

1. Initial domain familiarization through document analysis of manuals, procedures, and system documentation
2. Semi-structured interviews with domain experts to identify purposes, priorities, functions, and constraints
3. Field observations to validate understanding
4. Iterative refinement and validation of the model with domain experts

The structure of the abstraction hierarchy framework acts as a guide to acquiring the knowledge necessary to understand the domain. The framework helps to direct the search for deep knowledge, providing structure to the document analysis process, particularly for the domain novice. While the output may initially appear overbearing, its value to the analysis cannot be overstated. The abstraction hierarchy defines the systemic constraints at the highest level.

One of the advantages of the abstraction hierarchy model is that it can be used to explore the effect of new technology on the system values and purposes. Additional technologies can be modeled at the base of the model and their effect assessed through the mean-ends links to the top of the diagram.
