= AcciMap approach =

Systems-based technique for accident analysis

The AcciMap approach is a systems-based technique for accident analysis, specifically for analysing the causes of accidents and incidents that occur in complex sociotechnical systems.

The approach was originally developed by Jens Rasmussen as part of a proactive risk management strategy, but its primary application has been as an accident analysis tool.

== Overview ==
The approach is not domain-specific and has been used to analyse accidents in a range of industries including aviation, defence, oil and gas, public health, risk management, policing, and public health and rail transport. The method is used to analyse the contributing factors of accidents at all levels of the system, and can also be utilised to formulate safety recommendations.

== Features ==
The AcciMap approach is useful for uncovering how factors in the various parts of the system contributed to an accident, and for arranging those factors into a logical causal diagram that illustrates how they combined to result in that event. The method also promotes a systemic view of accident causation as the AcciMap diagram extends well beyond the most immediate causes of the event to reveal the full range of higher-level factors that contributed to the outcome (or failed to prevent it from occurring). It therefore assists analysts in understanding how and why an accident took place, and prevents attention from focusing disproportionately on the immediate causes (such as errors made by front-line workers), because the factors that provoked or permitted those factors are also revealed. The approach therefore helps to avoid blaming frontline individuals for accidents and leaving the factors that contributed to their behaviour unaddressed. In extending to consider contributing factors at governmental, regulatory and societal levels, the approach also has the capacity to capture and address high-level contributing factors that are typically excluded from accident analyses developed using other methods.

== Structure ==
The AcciMap approach involves the construction of a multi-layered causal diagram in which the various causes of an accident are arranged according to their causal remoteness from the outcome (depicted at the bottom of the diagram). The most immediate causes are shown in the lower sections of the diagram, with more remote causes shown at progressively higher levels, so that the full range of factors that contributed to the event are modelled.

The precise format of the diagram varies depending on the purpose of analysis, but the lower levels typically represent the immediate precursors to the event, relating to the activities of workers and to physical events, processes and conditions that contributed to the outcome. The next highest levels typically represent company and organisational-level factors. The highest levels generally incorporate governmental or societal-level causal factors, which are external to the organisation(s) involved in the event. Compiling the multiple contributing factors and their interrelationships into a single logical diagram in this way helps analysts understand how and why the event took place and pinpoints problem areas that can be addressed to improve system safety.
