= Cognitive engineering =

Method of study of neuro-psychology

Cognitive engineering is an interdisciplinary field that applies principles from cognitive psychology, cognitive neuroscience, and human factors to design and develop engineering systems that effectively support or enhance human cognitive processes. The field emerged in the 1980s when Donald Norman and others recognized the need to better understand how humans interact with complex technological systems.

Unlike traditional engineering design approaches that focus primarily on physical and technical aspects, cognitive engineering emphasizes understanding the mental models, decision-making processes, attention, memory, and information processing capabilities of users. This user-centered approach aims to create systems that are intuitive, reduce cognitive load, minimize human error, and optimize overall human-computer interaction. Cognitive engineering methods include task analysis, cognitive work analysis, cognitive modeling, usability testing, and various forms of user research.

== History ==
It was an engineering method used in the 1970s at Bell Labs, focused on how people form a cognitive model of a system based upon common metaphors. As explained, by Joseph Henry Condon:

"The idea is that people form a model. You present them with some instruments, tools, like a faucet, electric stove or something like that and demonstrate how it works. They then form in their heads a model that shows how it works inside to help them remember how to use it in the future. It may be a totally erroneous model of what is going on inside the black box."

— Joseph Henry Condon, "Interview with Joseph H. Condon (transcript)". History of Science, Princeton University.

According to Condon, the ideas of cognitive engineering were developed later than, and independent from, the early work on the Unix operating system.

Don Norman cited principles of cognitive engineering in his 1981 article, "The truth about Unix: The user interface is horrid." Norman criticized the user interface of Unix as being "a disaster for the casual user." However the "casual user" is not the target audience for UNIX and as the Condon quote above indicates, a high level of user interface abstraction leads to cognitive models that may be "totally erroneous."

== See also ==
- Cognitive systems engineering
- History of Unix
- Outline of human–computer interaction
