= Endogenous preferences =

Concept in economics

Endogenous preferences are preferences that cannot be taken as given, but are affected by individual internal responses to the external state of affairs. They are interdependent, in part determined by social institutions, marketed advertisement, and subject to learning (experience and observation) and habit formation (past-experience).

== See also ==
- Acquired taste
