= Sidney Dekker =

Dutch-Australian professor

Sidney W. A. Dekker is Professor in the School of Humanities, Languages and Social Science at Griffith University in Brisbane, Australia, where he founded the Safety Science Innovation Lab. He is a trained mediator and he volunteers as a crisis chaplain.

Previously, Dekker was Professor of human factors and system safety at Lund University in Sweden, where he founded the Leonardo da Vinci Laboratory for Complexity and Systems Thinking, and flew as First Officer on Boeing 737s for Sterling and later Cimber Airlines out of Copenhagen. He is an avid piano player. Dekker is a high-profile scholar (h-index = 63) and is known globally for his work in the fields of human factors and safety. He coined the terms Safety Differently and Restorative Just Culture which have since turned into global movements for change. They encourage organisations to declutter their bureaucracy and enhance the capacities in people and processes that make things go well—and to offer compassion, restoration and learning when they don’t.

Safety Differently, developed by Sidney Dekker in 2012, represents a fundamental shift from traditional safety management. It sees safety not as the absence of negative events but as the presence of positive capacities in people, teams and processes that make things go well. It challenges conventional safety thinking: People aren't the problem to control; they are the resource to harness. Instead of stopping things from going wrong, organizations can set their people up for success. Restorative Just Culture was developed by Sidney Dekker in 2014, with its first large-scale implementation at Mersey Care NHS Foundation Trust in Liverpool, UK. The approach integrates principles of restorative justice into organizations' responses to incidents and adverse events, identifying the impacts and meeting the needs created by incidents, and establishing a forward-looking accountability with obligations for making things right, repairing trust and restoring relationships.

Safety Differently and Restorative Just Culture have both deeply influenced a number of industries, including healthcare, aviation, resources and heavy industry, leading organizations to fundamentally reconsider their approach to safety management, responses to failure and worker engagement. The concept builds upon theoretical foundations in resilience engineering and complexity theory, while offering practical applications for organizational leadership. Part of the group of founding scientists behind 'Resilience Engineering,' Sidney Dekker's work has inspired the birth of HOP (Human and Organizational Performance), New View Safety, Learning Teams, and more.

== Publications ==
=== Books ===
- Safety Theater (2025)
- Restorative Just Culture (2025)
- Ten virtues of a positive safety culture (2025)
- Being a Crisis Chaplain (2025)
- Random Noise (2024)
- Stop Blaming (2023)
- Do Safety Differently (2022)
- Compliance Capitalism (2021)
- Foundations of Safety Science: A century of understanding accidents and disasters (2019)
- The Safety Anarchist (2017)
- The End of Heaven (2017)
- Just Culture: Restoring Trust and Accountability in your Organization (2016)
- Safety Differently: Human Factors for a New Era (2015)
- The Field Guide to Understanding 'Human Error' (2014)
- Second Victim: Error, guilt, trauma and resilience (2013)
- Just Culture: Balancing Safety and Accountability (2012)
- Drift into Failure: From hunting broken components to understanding complex systems (2011)
- Patient Safety: A human factors approach (2011)
- The Field Guide to Human Error Investigations (2002)

=== Documentaries ===
- The Complexity of Failure — in collaboration with Brisbane-based RideFree Media
- Doing Safety Differently — in collaboration with Brisbane-based RideFree Media
- Just Culture: The Movie — in collaboration with Brisbane-based RideFree Media
- Safety Differently: The Movie – in collaboration with Brisbane-based RideFree Media, Sidney directed and presented his debut documentary in 2017.
