= Jens Rasmussen (human factors expert) =

Danish system safety and human factors professor (1926–2018)

- Born: 11 May 1926; Ribe, Denmark
- Died: 5 February 2018 (aged 91)
- Known for: dynamic safety model, risk management framework, skill-rule-knowledge model, abstraction hierarchy, ecological interface design, AcciMaps
- Scientific career
- Fields: safety science

Jens Rasmussen (11 May 1926 – 5 February 2018) was a system safety, human factors and cognitive systems engineering researcher at the Risø National Laboratory in Risø, Denmark. He was highly influential within the field of safety science, human error and accident research. His contributions include the skills, rules, knowledge (SRK) framework, risk management framework, dynamic safety model, AcciMap Approach, and others.

== Biography ==
Rasmussen was born in Ribe, Denmark. In 1950, he earned an M.Sc. degree in electronic engineering, with a background in control engineering. After completing his degree, he worked for several years at the Radio Receiver Research Laboratory.

In 1956, Rasmussen was recruited to work at the Danish Atomic Energy Commission. After several years, he was named the head of the Electronics Department at the Atomic Research Establishment Risø (eventually renamed Risø National Laboratory).

In 1981, Rasmussen was appointed Research Professor at both the Technical University of Denmark and at Risø National Laboratory.

== Contributions ==
=== Dynamic safety model ===
Rasmussen proposed a state-based model of a socio-technical system as a system that moves within a region of a state space. The region is surrounded by three boundaries:

- economic failure
- unacceptable work load
- functionality acceptable performance

Incentives push the system towards the boundary of acceptable performance: accidents happen when the boundary is exceeded.

=== Risk management framework ===
Rasmussen proposed a multi-layer view of socio-technical systems, with hazardous processes and work at the lowest level, and government at the highest level. The different levels involve different research disciplines (e.g., mechanical, chemical, and electrical engineering at the lowest level, political science, law, economics, and sociology at the highest level, and other domains in-between) and different environmental stressors (e.g., changing political climate at the top level, fast pace of technological change at the lowest level)

=== Skills, rules, knowledge (SRK) framework ===
See Skills, Rules, Knowledge (SRK) framework.

=== Abstraction hierarchy ===
See the abstraction hierarchy.

=== Ecological interface design ===
See Ecological interface design.

=== AcciMaps ===
See AcciMap approach.

== Selected publications ==
=== Books ===
- Jens Rasmussen, Annelise M. Pejtersen, L.P.Goodstein (1994). Cognitive Systems Engineering. John Wiley & Sons. ISBN 0471011983.
- Jens Rasmussen (1986). Information processing and human-machine interaction: an approach to cognitive engineering. North-Holland. ISBN 9780444009876.
- Jens Rasmussen (2000). Proactive Risk Management in a Dynamic Society. Swedish Rescue Services Agency. ISBN 9172530847.

=== Papers ===
- Rasmussen, Jens; Jensen, A (1974). "Mental procedures in real-life tasks: a case study of electronic trouble shooting". Ergonomics. 17 (3): 293–307. doi:10.1080/00140137408931355. PMID 4442376.
- Rasmussen, Jens (May–June 1983). "Skills, rules, and knowledge; signals, signs, and symbols, and other distinctions in human performance models". IEEE Transactions on Systems, Man, and Cybernetics. SMC-13 (3): 257–266. doi:10.1109/TSMC.1983.6313160. S2CID 1525146 – via IEEE Xplore.
- Cook, Richard; Rasmussen, Jens (2005). ""Going solid": a model of system dynamics and consequences for patient safety". BMJ Quality & Safety. 14 (2): 130–134. doi:10.1136/qshc.2003.009530. PMC 1743994. PMID 15805459.
