= Human error =

Action with unintended consequences

Human error is an action that has been done but that was "not intended by the actor; not desired by a set of rules or an external observer; or that led the task or system outside its acceptable limits". Human error has been cited as a primary cause and contributing factor in disasters and accidents in industries as diverse as nuclear power (e.g., the Three Mile Island accident), aviation (e.g., United Airlines Flight 173), space exploration (e.g., the Space Shuttle Challenger disaster and Space Shuttle Columbia disaster), and medicine. Prevention of human error is generally seen as a major contributor to reliability and safety of (complex) systems. Human error is one of the many contributing causes of risk events.

== Definition ==
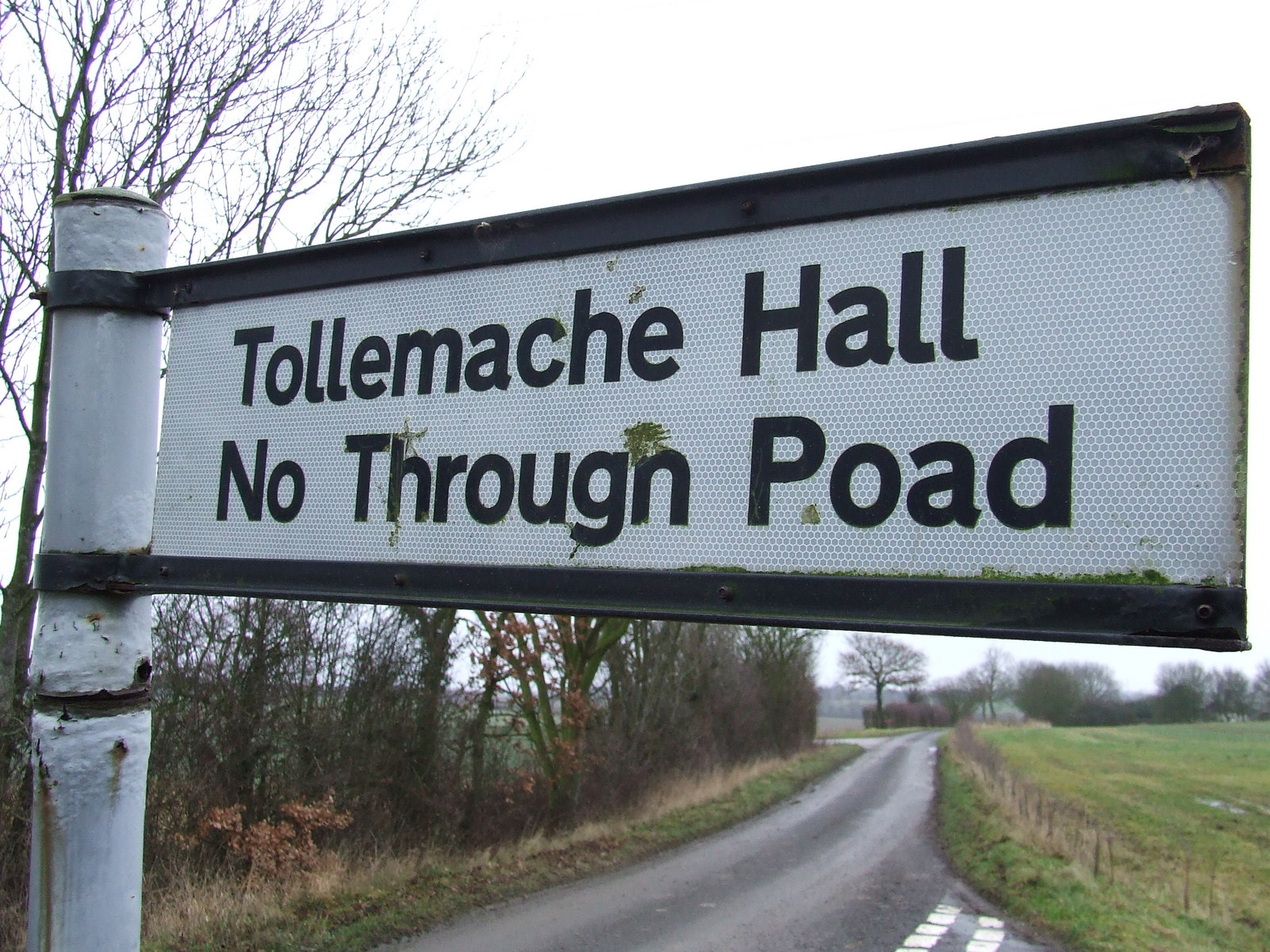
A sign with a spelling mistake; the word "road" has been spelled incorrectly with a P instead of an R.

Human error refers to something having been done that was "not intended by the actor; not desired by a set of rules or an external observer; or that led the task or system outside its acceptable limits". In short, it is a deviation from intention, expectation or desirability. Logically, human actions can fail to achieve their goal in two different ways: the actions can go as planned, but the plan can be inadequate (leading to mistakes); or, the plan can be satisfactory, but the performance can be deficient (leading to slips and lapses). However, a mere failure is not an error if there had been no plan to accomplish something in particular.

== Performance ==
Human error and performance are two sides of the same coin: "human error" mechanisms are the same as "human performance" mechanisms; performance later categorized as 'error' is done so in hindsight: therefore actions later termed "human error" are actually part of the ordinary spectrum of human behaviour. The study of absent-mindedness in everyday life provides ample documentation and categorization of such aspects of behavior. Having a sense of awareness is needed to understand when dealing with a potential danger, thus being able to correct it. While human error is firmly entrenched in the classical approaches to accident investigation and risk assessment, it has no role in newer approaches such as resilience engineering.

== Categories ==
There are many ways to categorize human error:

- exogenous versus endogenous error (i.e., originating outside versus inside the individual)
- situation assessment versus response planning and related distinctions in
  - error in problem detection (also see signal detection theory)
  - error in problem diagnosis (also see problem solving)
  - error in action planning and execution (for example: slips or errors of execution versus mistakes or errors of intention)
- by level of analysis; for example, perceptual (e.g., optical illusions) versus cognitive versus communication versus organizational
- physical manipulation error
  - 'slips' occurring when the physical action fails to achieve the immediate objective
  - 'lapses' involve a failure of one's memory or recall
- active error - observable, physical action that changes equipment, system, or facility state, resulting in immediate undesired consequences
- latent human error resulting in hidden organization-related weaknesses or equipment flaws that lie dormant; such errors can go unnoticed at the time they occur, having no immediate apparent outcome
- equipment dependency error – lack of vigilance due to the assumption that hardware controls or physical safety devices will always work
- team error – lack of vigilance created by the social (interpersonal) interaction between two or more people working together
- personal dependencies error – unsafe attitudes and traps of human nature leading to complacency and overconfidence

== Sources ==
The cognitive study of human error is a very active research field, including work related to limits of memory and attention and also to decision making strategies such as the availability heuristic and other cognitive biases. Such heuristics and biases are strategies that are useful and often correct, but can lead to systematic patterns of error.

Misunderstandings as a topic in human communication have been studied in conversation analysis, such as the examination of violations of the cooperative principle and Gricean maxims.

Organizational studies of error or dysfunction have included studies of safety culture. One technique for analyzing complex systems failure that incorporates organizational analysis is management oversight risk tree analysis.

== Controversies ==
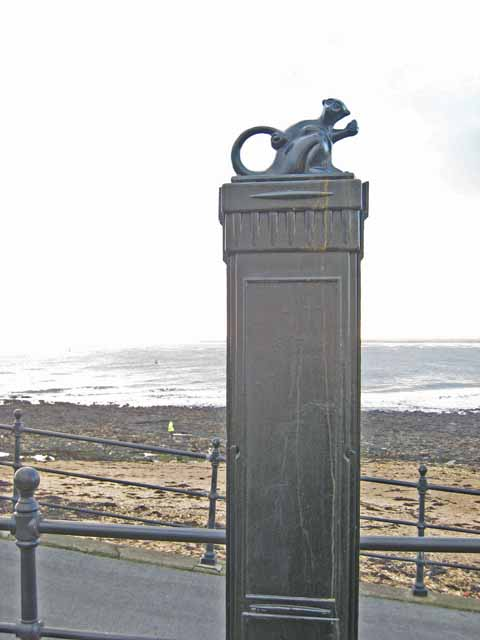
The "Hartlepool monkey" statue in Hartlepool, England, commemorating a monkey who was mistaken by locals to be a French soldier and killed.

Some researchers have argued that the dichotomy of human actions as "correct" or "incorrect" is a harmful oversimplification of a complex phenomenon. A focus on the variability of human performance and how human operators (and organizations) can manage that variability, may be a more fruitful approach. Newer approaches, such as resilience engineering mentioned above, highlight the positive roles that humans can play in complex systems. In resilience engineering, successes (things that go right) and failures (things that go wrong) are seen as having the same basis, namely human performance variability. A specific account of that is the efficiency–thoroughness trade-off principle, which can be found on all levels of human activity, in individuals as well as in groups.

== See also ==
- Action slip
- Behavior-shaping constraint
- Error-tolerant design
- Human reliability
- Poka-yoke
- SHELL model
- User error
- Technique for human error-rate prediction
- Fallacy
- To err is human
- Ukraine International Airlines Flight 752
