= Bluebird International =

Hungarian IT staffing company

- Type: Private
- Industry: Technology
- Founded: 2001; 25 years ago
- Headquarters: Budapest, Hungary
- Area served: Europe and North America
- Key people: Balazs Refi (Founder), Veronika Refi (CEO), Zsolt Csepelyi
- Products: IT staffing, outsourcing, software development, project management, Staff Augmentation, IT services, web development, software testing, mobile development, E-commerce Development, RPO
- Revenue: EUR 8,835,788 (2023)
- Website: www.bluebirdinternational.com

Bluebird International Zrt. is a Hungarian-owned IT recruitment and IT staff augmentation company based in Budapest. Its main activities are IT recruitment and the provision of IT specialists on a project basis (IT staff augmentation, known as IT contracting in Hungary). Besides Hungary, the company also operates in Ireland, the United States and Austria.

The company was founded in 2001 by Balazs Refi, an IT project manager and systems administrator. Initially operating as a one-man business, Bluebird later developed into an IT staffing (IT recruitment and contracting) firm. By 2024, the headcount at its Budapest headquarters had exceeded 50, whilst around 120 IT specialists were working on client projects across Hungary.

Bluebird publishes the Bluebird IT Salary Guide, a Hungarian IT salary report that presents current salary data and labour market trends for specific IT specialisms and roles in Hungary.

== History ==
Bluebird International began operating in Budapest in 2001 as a one-man business. Its first assignments included IT development projects in Hungary and Germany. The company’s activities later expanded into IT contracting and then IT recruitment.

Bluebird subsequently began its international expansion. In 2012, it entered the Austrian market under the name Bluebird Personalberatungs GmbH, with an office in Vienna.

Around 2020, the company’s services were expanded to include fixed-price IT development projects, including in the areas of web and application development. The company discontinued this business line at the end of 2025 and refocused its activities primarily on recruitment and IT contracting.

In March 2023, the company’s Budapest headquarters moved to the H2Offices office block on Váci út. In 2026, Bluebird International celebrated its 25th anniversary.

== Leadership ==
In January 2024, Viktoria Hradek took over the role of CEO from the company’s founder, Balazs Refi. In October 2025, Veronika Refi became Chief Executive Officer of Bluebird International.

The company’s founder, Balazs Refi, passed away in January 2026. He had led Bluebird for more than two decades since its foundation in 2001.

In June 2026, Zsolt Csepelyi joined the company as Chief Growth & Transformation Officer.

== Business activities ==
Bluebird International specialises primarily in the recruitment and placement of IT professionals, as well as IT contracting. As part of its contracting service, it provides IT professionals to its corporate clients on a project basis.

Later, Bluebird gradually expanded its recruitment activities in Hungary to include non-IT roles, primarily white-collar positions, including engineering, finance, accounting, sales and marketing.

The company provides recruitment and IT contracting services to large Hungarian and international corporations, as well as small and mid-sized enterprises. Its clients include Bosch, Siemens and OTP Bank, amongst others.

=== Bluebird IT Salary Guide ===
The company regularly compiles and publishes the Bluebird IT Salary Guide, a survey of IT salaries in Hungary. The publication presents salary ranges and labour market trends in the Hungarian IT sector based on various IT roles, technologies and levels of experience.

The data from the Salary Guide and Bluebird’s labour market analyses are regularly cited by the Hungarian business and industry press.

== Awards and honours ==
Bluebird International won the DreamJobs ‘Best Places to Work’ Award in 2017, and again every year between 2021 and 2025.

=== Corporate social responsibility initiatives ===
Bluebird International is committed to supporting the community in a variety of ways. Its corporate social responsibility activities include supporting disadvantaged children, sick children, the homeless and those in need, as well as creating opportunities for talented but disadvantaged individuals.
