= Lifeblood =

Lifeblood or Life blood can refer to:

- Australian Red Cross Lifeblood, the organisation responsible for blood and related donations in Australia
- Blood, a bodily fluid in animals
- Life Blood (film), a supernatural horror thriller film released in 2009
- Lifeblood (album), the seventh studio album by the Welsh alternative rock band Manic Street Preachers
- Lifesblood, a 2001 EP by Mastodon
- Lifeblood (novel), sequel to the novel Darkside, a children's novel by Tom Becker
- Life's Blood, an American hardcore punk band
- "Life's Blood", a song by the Eighteen Visions from their EP Lifeless and album The Best of Eighteen Visions
- Lifeblood (charity), a UK-based charity now known as Thrombosis UK
- Lifeblood, 2021 studio album by Brand of Sacrifice
