= The North West Company =

Canada-based multinational grocery and retail company

The North West Company Inc.
- Type: Public
- Traded as: TSX: NWC
- Industry: Grocery; fur; general merchandise
- Founded: 1987; 39 years ago
- Headquarters: Winnipeg, Manitoba, Canada
- Key people: Daniel G. McConnell, President & CEO
- Number of employees: 6,805
- Subsidiaries: Alaska Commercial Company; North Star Air
- Website: www.northwest.ca

The North West Company Inc. is a multinational Canadian grocery and retail company which operates stores in Canada's western provinces and northern territories; the United States states of Alaska and Hawaii; and several other countries and territories of the United States in Oceania and the Caribbean.

The company traces its history back to the North West Company, a fur trading business headquartered in the city of Montreal in British North America from 1779 to 1821. It was merged into the Hudson's Bay Company in 1821. The enterprise continued as the Fur Trade Department, and then the Northern Stores Division of Hudson's Bay Company. In 1987, the division was acquired by a group of investors and in the 1990s it was relaunched as North West Company. It is now a publicly traded company and is composed mainly of the old HBC Northern Stores Division. The Alaska Commercial Company, which makes up The North West Company's Alaskan operations, traced its roots back to the Russian-American Company. Cost-U-Less, which operates in Hawaii, the South Pacific and the Caribbean, was acquired in 2007. In 2017, 76% of Roadtown Wholesale Trading Ltd, which operates in the British Virgin Islands, was acquired.

== Brief history ==
The French controlled much of what is now Canada in the early 1700s. As a result, their traders had a large fur trading network. After the conquest of New France by the British in 1763, Scottish immigrants forced out of Scotland by the Highland Clearances founded the North West Company and continued expanding their fur trade into the Canadian interior. The firm, along with its competitor the Hudson's Bay Company, built numerous fur trade posts, explored and mapped the interior, and ultimately exhausted the beaver population. The fur trade created conflict which increased tensions between the British, French and Indigenous Peoples.

== Current operations ==
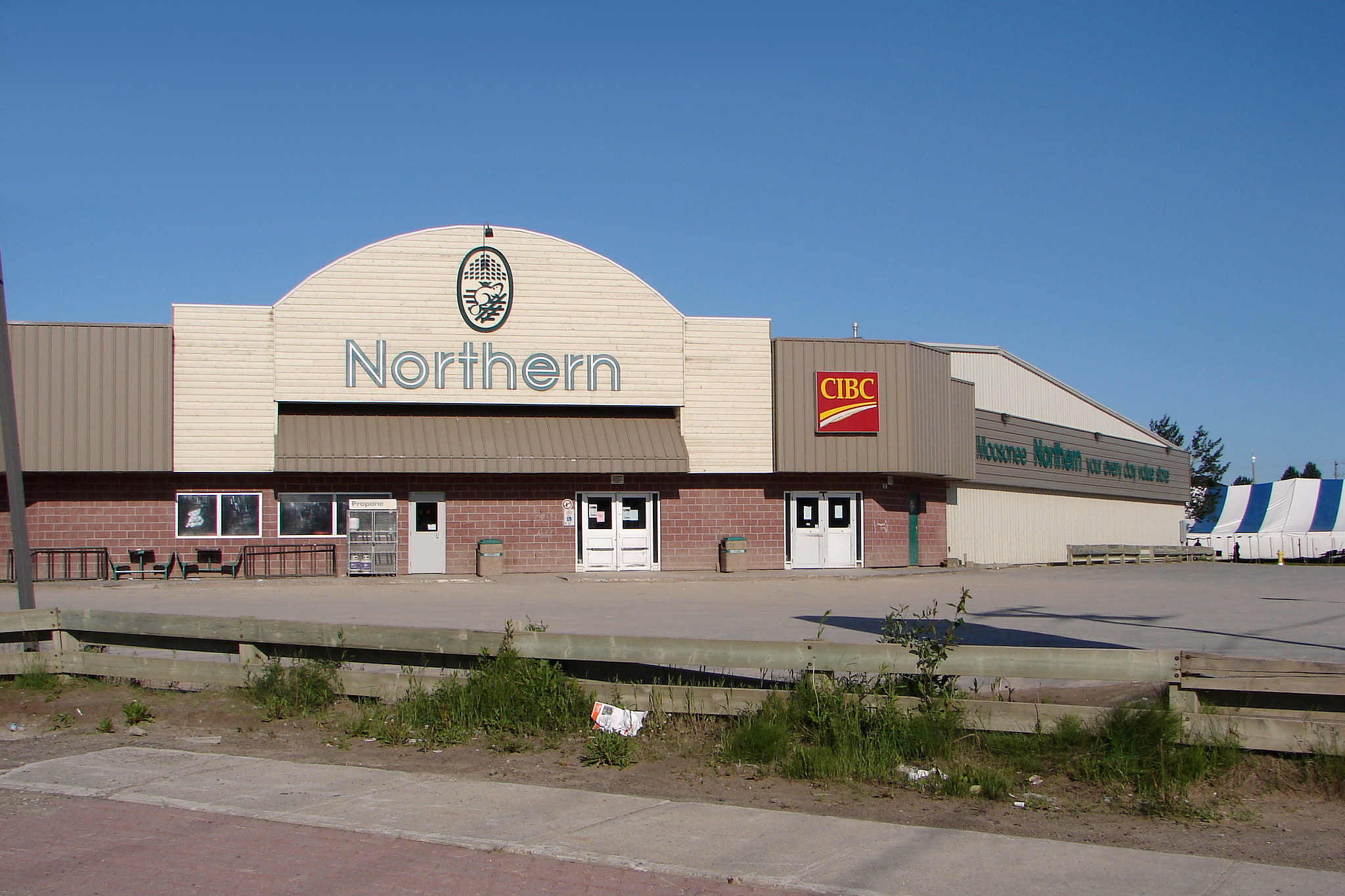
Northern Store in Moosonee, Ontario

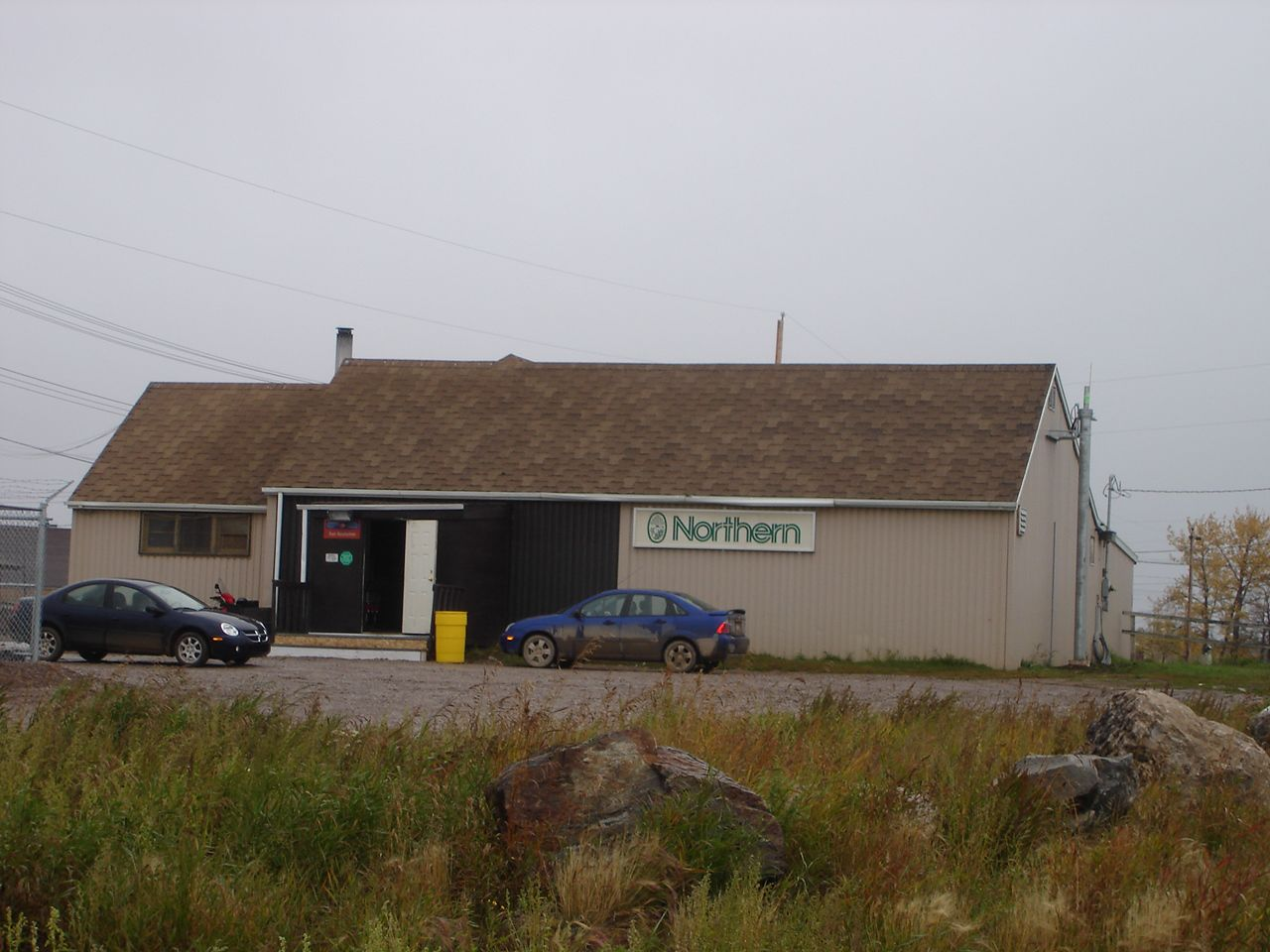
Northern Store in Fort Resolution, Northwest Territories

The North West Company's head office is located in Winnipeg, Manitoba, Canada, built partly on the site of Upper Fort Garry. This building used to serve as the head office of the Hudson's Bay Company. It also operates two offices in the United States cities of Anchorage, Alaska, and Boca Raton, Florida.

As of 2014, the North West Company had 4,921 employees in Canada and 1,726 employees in its international operations in Alaska, the South Pacific, and the Caribbean. It was the largest employer of Indigenous People in the business sector.

The company operates stores under these banners:

- Canadian operations
  - Northern (one hundred and twenty-two stores) – Northern Ontario, Quebec, Alberta, Saskatchewan, Manitoba, Labrador, Nunavut, Northwest Territories, Yukon,
  - NorthMart (six locations across Northern Canada, excluding Yukon and in Manitoba and Labrador) – Cross Lake, Manitoba; Iqaluit, Nunavut; Goose Bay, Labrador; and Hay River and Inuvik, Northwest Territories
  - Quickstop (five locations)
  - Giant Tiger (four locations in Saskatchewan (1), Manitoba (1) and Ontario (1)); operated under franchise from Giant Tiger Ltd.)
  - Valu Lots (one location, Prince Albert, Saskatchewan)
  - Solo Market (one location, Pinawa, Manitoba)
  - North West Company Fur Marketing (two locations)
  - Crescent Multi Foods – distributor operating in Saskatchewan, Manitoba, and northern Ontario
  - Inuit Art Marketing Service (based in Toronto)
  - North Star Air – cargo and passenger airline based in Thunder Bay, Ontario
- International operations
  - AC Value Center (thirty stores in Alaska)
  - Quickstop (three stores in Alaska)
  - CostULess (twelve stores in American Samoa, Barbados, the Cayman Islands, Curacao, Fiji, Guam, Hawaii, Sint Maarten, and the United States Virgin Islands)
  - Pacific Alaska Wholesale – distributor based in Anchorage, Alaska
  - Roadtown Wholesale (eight stores in the British Virgin Islands)

=== We Financial ===
We Financial is the financial services division that operates a series of automatic teller machines (ATM) in each store, and offers the We Credit Card and We Prepaid Visa (jointly with Peoples Card Services). The division also offers cheque cashing, tax services and operates 64 Canada Post outlets (Retail Post Outlet).
