= Purple squirrel =

Job recruitment term for rare candidates

Purple squirrel is a term used by employment recruiters to describe a job candidate with precisely the right education, set of experience, and range of qualifications that perfectly fits a job's requirements. The implication is that over-specification of the requirements makes a perfect candidate as hard to find as a purple squirrel.

While in theory, this prized "purple squirrel" could immediately handle all the expansive variety of responsibilities of a job description with no training, and would allow businesses to function with fewer workers, it is commonly asserted that the effort seeking them is often wasted. In addition, being open to candidates that don't have all the skills or retraining existing employees are each sensible alternatives to an over-long search.

== Origin and history ==
While it is unclear when exactly the term was coined, it was in use by 2000. In 2010, CBS published material using the term, writing that "businesses are looking to do more with fewer workers, so they want [purple squirrels] who are able to take on a wide range of duties." In 2012, Google recruiter Michael B. Junge published a popular job search and career book Purple Squirrel: Stand Out, Land Interviews, and Master the Modern Job Market, which helped popularize the term. Elon Musk tweeted in 2012, "Do not search for purple squirrels! Giving them attention only makes them want to be more purple."; this is likely also a reference to this term.

== See also ==
- Sourcing (personnel)
- Employee referral
- Perfect is the enemy of good
- Reserve army of labour
