= Social recruiting =

Social recruiting (social hiring or social media recruitment) is recruiting candidates by using social platforms as talent databases or for advertising. Social recruiting uses social media profiles, blogs, and other Internet sites to find information on candidates. It also uses social media to advertise jobs either through HR vendors or through crowdsourcing where job seekers and others share job openings within their online social networks.

Social recruiting's effectiveness and return on investment have been difficult to determine, since applicants do not usually apply through the social channels which first attracted them. In May 2013, Maximum Employment Marketing Group released the Social Recruitment Monitor, which ranks the reach, engagement, and interactivity of employers' social recruiting efforts around the world.

== Social recruitment software ==
The social recruitment software market (a form of e-recruitment) is often included in the wider talent management software sector. Bersin & Associates valued the wider talent management market at over $2bn in 2007. Social recruitment increasingly sits at an intersection of a number of fast-moving areas including social networking, recruitment and now cloud computing. Additionally, mobile recruiting has become another hot topic, especially with the rise in tablet and smartphone usage.

In 2012, there was a rise of tech companies using social recruiting applications to find and screen applicants. As more companies saw value in filling jobs by putting them on the social platforms where millions of people spend at least 37 minutes daily, there developed a much larger focus on social recruiting among the talent acquisition community. By mid-2013, many major enterprise companies such as Pepsi, Gap, AIG, and Oracle had begun effectively utilizing social recruiting software, making it clear that large corporations were open to automating or streamlining (and ultimately investing in) their social recruiting processes.
