= Staff augmentation =

Staffing strategy using external workers to supplement internal teams

Staff augmentation is a contracting and staffing approach in which an organization temporarily increases its workforce capacity by contracting for individuals with specific skills to supplement internal staff. In staff augmentation arrangements, external personnel commonly work alongside employees and may take day-to-day direction from the client organization, distinguishing the model from outsourcing arrangements in which a supplier delivers a defined service or outcome under its own management.

The term is used in multiple sectors, particularly in information technology (IT), engineering, and professional services procurement, and is sometimes contrasted with statement of work (SOW) contracting and managed services models.

== Background and evolution ==
Contract staffing and temporary agency work have existed in labour markets for a long time. In official statistics, related arrangements may be captured through categories such as temporary help agency workers, contract firm workers, and independent contractors, rather than through a separate "staff augmentation" classification.

In IT and project-based professional work, staff augmentation is often described as a way to obtain specialized skills or additional capacity for limited periods, particularly when organizations cannot hire quickly enough or do not require a permanent increase in headcount.

In staff augmentation, external workers are provided to supplement internal teams for a defined period or initiative. The client commonly assigns tasks and supervises work, and pricing is often time and materials (hourly or daily rates).

== Use cases and industries ==
Common use cases include responding to short-term demand increases, addressing specialized skill gaps, supporting time-limited projects, and accelerating delivery schedules. In government IT procurement, staff augmentation contracts are frequently framed as temporary technology staffing assistance for project initiatives, with defined durations and roles such as developers, analysts, and security specialists.

Industries frequently associated with staff augmentation include information technology and software development, engineering and technical services, healthcare staffing, and business support functions. In industry reporting for the United States staffing market, IT, industrial, and healthcare staffing are commonly described as major segments of staffing revenue.

== Benefits, criticisms and risks ==
Potential benefits described in procurement and management sources include faster access to scarce skills, flexibility to scale workforce capacity up or down, and reduced long-term hiring commitment compared with permanent recruitment.

Common criticisms and risks include:

- Cost and budgeting uncertainty, particularly where engagements are time-and-materials and extended beyond initial intent.
- Organizational dependency and knowledge retention concerns when key domain knowledge or system familiarity resides with external workers rather than employees.
- Legal and compliance risks, including worker classification disputes and joint employment or co-employment exposure where client organizations control working conditions while workers are employed by a third party.
- Information security and data protection risks where external workers require access to systems and personal data, often mitigated through contractual controls and access management.

== Employment status and worker classification ==
Employment and tax authorities often assess whether a worker is an employee or an independent contractor by examining the degree of control and independence in the relationship. The U.S. Internal Revenue Service describes classification as a facts-and-circumstances assessment focusing on the extent of the right to direct and control work, noting there is no single determinative factor.

In the United Kingdom, the off-payroll working rules (known as IR35) aim to ensure that workers providing services through intermediaries pay broadly similar Income Tax and National Insurance contributions to employees when the underlying relationship would otherwise be employment.

In the United States, the Department of Labor published guidance (effective March 11, 2024) on analyzing employee versus independent contractor status under the Fair Labor Standards Act, and subsequent administrations have proposed revisions, reflecting ongoing policy and litigation changes.

== Temporary agency work protections ==
In the European Union, Directive 2008/104/EC establishes a framework for the working conditions of temporary agency workers, aiming to ensure a minimum level of protection and support the development of temporary agency work.

== Immigration and cross-border work ==
Cross-border provision of staff augmentation may trigger immigration, right-to-work, and work authorization requirements. Some procurement processes explicitly ask whether providers sponsor work visas for personnel supplying services, reflecting compliance considerations in sourcing decisions.

== Market indicators and trends ==
Because staff augmentation is not consistently tracked as a standalone statistical series, indicators are often drawn from labor statistics for related categories and from staffing industry reporting.

In the United States, the Current Employment Statistics series for temporary help services reported 2,447.4 thousand employees in February 2026.

In the July 2023 Contingent Worker Supplement, the U.S. Bureau of Labor Statistics reported 4.3% of employed people in contingent jobs, and measured alternative arrangements including independent contractors (7.4%), on-call workers (1.7%), temporary help agency workers (0.6%), and workers provided through contract firms (0.5%).

Industry-level reporting indicates continued growth in contract-role posting shares in online job postings data, and global staffing industry reporting has described rising placements even during cyclical downturns in revenues.

== Providers and platforms ==
Staff augmentation services may be delivered through traditional staffing firms, consultancies, and specialized IT staffing providers, as well as through digital labor platforms that match organizations with independent professionals.

== Management and governance practices ==
Organizations commonly manage staff augmentation through contracts specifying roles, duration, supervision, confidentiality, and security controls. Public sector procurement documents frequently require defined deliverables, time limits, and performance management processes even for time-and-materials engagements.

== See also ==
- Outsourcing
- Staffing
- Recruitment
- Temporary work
- Independent contractor
- Gig economy
- Professional employer organization
