= The Amorist =

British erotic magazine

- Cover of July 2017 issue
- Editor-in-chief: Rowan Pelling
- Categories: Erotic magazine
- Frequency: Monthly
- Publisher: James Pembroke Publishing
- First issue: April 2017
- Country: United Kingdom
- Based in: London, U.K.
- Language: English
- Website: The Amorist

The Amorist is an English-language erotic magazine launched in 2017 in the United Kingdom.

== History ==
Rowan Pelling, after working as a columnist at the Daily Telegraph, a journalist at Private Eye, and an editor of the Erotic Review, started The Amorist in April 2017 with a "small staff" of an editorial team of four (herself, a deputy editor, a designer, and a features editor) and a "tight budget." The first issue had seven pages of advertising, including ads for an "upmarket" sex toy company and a matchmaking service, with an initial print-run of 12,000 and a cover price of £4.95.

== Content ==
The magazine's founder and chief editor had stated she aimed for "a monthly anthology of erotica, news, reviews and fiction, a blend of love, romance and sex." Pelling's stated challenge is "to get it on the general interest shelf next to National Geographic."

== Online ==
After about seven months of publication, the magazine switched to an online-only format.

== See also ==
- Erotica
- Erotic literature
