= Once More, with Feeling (book) =

Book by Victoria Coren and Charlie Skelton

Once More, with Feeling: How We Tried to Make the Greatest Porn Film Ever
- Authors: Victoria Coren; Charlie Skelton
- Language: English
- Publication date: 2003
- Publication place: United States
- Media type: Print
- ISBN: 978-1841154374

Once More, with Feeling: How We Tried to Make the Greatest Porn Film Ever is a 2003 book by Victoria Coren and Charlie Skelton. The authors, whose only experience of the pornography industry were as journalists for the Erotic Review magazine, set out to make a pornographic film which would differ from the industry's standard output. Once More, with Feeling is their account of the time they spent researching and shooting the film.

The film they made was entitled The Naughty Twins and was only screened for "friends, colleagues and some blokes off the telly". Rowan Pelling, writing for The Independent, stated that "the plot was labyrinthine" and claimed she "particularly liked a lesbian bath scene where a muscular plumber enters the room with an enormous spanner, consults his pager, then says, "Oh dear, wrong day!" and promptly disappears."

The book deal was in place before the movie was shot.

== Reception ==
The Times review said, "What could so easily have been a saucy postcard of a book becomes a rewarding meditation on human desire – with lots of smut." (The postcard reference is to the work of Donald McGill.) The Guardian called it "a relentlessly funny book", with Coren and Skelton "a couple of Hugh Grant-like characters". The Sunday Telegraph said it "is indeed a jolly read".
