= RPO =

RPO may refer to:

== Business ==
- Recovery point objective, a quantifiable goal in IT disaster recovery
- Recruitment process outsourcing
- Regular Production Option, a General Motors coding system

== Military ==
- Regulating Petty Officer, a rate (rank) in the Royal Navy Police
- RPO-A Shmel, a Russian grenade launcher

== Music ==
- Rochester Philharmonic Orchestra, in New York, US
- Royal Philharmonic Orchestra, in London, England

== Science and technology ==
- Recursive path ordering, in computer science
- Rendezvous and proximity operations, in spaceflight
- Research performing organisations, a classification in European science policy

== Sports ==
- Runs per over, or run rate, a measure in the game of cricket
- Run-pass option, an offensive scheme in American football

== Other ==
- Railway post office, a mobile post office set up in a railway car
- Retail Post Outlet, a Canadian postal abbreviation
- Revenue protection officer, a UK railway employee who issues penalty fares
- Rzecznik Praw Obywatelskich, a Polish ombudsman
