= Space Cadets (TV series) =

2005 British television programme

- Space Cadets logo
- Created by: Zeppotron
- Starring: Johnny Vaughan; Numerous actors and contestants
- Country of origin: United Kingdom
- No. of episodes: 10

Production
- Producer: Zeppotron
- Running time: 60 minutes

Original release
- Network: Channel 4
- Release: 7 December – 16 December 2005

Space Cadets is a British television programme made by Zeppotron (a division of Endemol UK) for Channel 4. Presented by Johnny Vaughan, it was aired across ten consecutive nights from 7 to 16 December 2005.

The series was a hoax at the expense of its contestants, who were told they were being trained as cosmonauts at a Russian military base before undergoing a five-day trip into low Earth orbit. In reality, the entire series was filmed in the UK, and the contestants did not leave Earth. The series was accompanied by a behind-the-scenes sister show Space Cadets: The Satellite Show, with interviews and phone-ins.

== Premise ==
The series described itself as the most elaborate hoax perpetrated in television history. Participants had been told that they would be appearing in a programme titled Thrill Seekers.

A group of twelve contestants, who answered an advertisement looking for "thrill seekers", were selected to become the first British televised space tourists, including going to Russia to train as cosmonauts at the "Space Tourist Agency of Russia" (STAR) military base, with the series culminating in a group of four embarking on a five-day space mission in low Earth orbit. The show and space mission contained aspects of reality TV, including hidden cameras, soundproofed 'video diary' rooms and group dormitories.

The show was in fact an elaborate practical joke, described by commissioning editor Angela Jain as "Candid Camera live in space" and claimed by Channel 4 to have cost roughly £5 million. Unknown to the "space cadets", they were not in Russia at all, but at Bentwaters Parks (formerly RAF Bentwaters, a USAF airfield from 1951 to 1993) in Suffolk staffed by costumed actors, and the "space trip" was entirely fake, complete with a wooden "shuttle" and actor "pilots". The production crew went so far as to replace light switches and electrical outlets in the barracks with Russian standard, stock Bentwaters with Russian-branded foods and toiletries for contestants to use, give smokers amongst the production crew Russian cigarettes to smoke in case any of the cadets discovered the butts, and employing people to clear the site of any British-branded litter. In addition, three of the cadets were actors, included to misdirect any suspicious cadets and to help reinforce the illusion.

Channel 4 had contingency plans if the contestants realised the hoax; Johnny Vaughan repeatedly suggested they would have to play old rerun episodes of Jamie's School Dinners, and after the "launch" some unchosen cadets would have been used as a backup crew.

According to Ben Caudell, the idea of the programme was inspired by one of his favourite childhood films, Capricorn One, which centres on a fake space mission to Mars. The production team originally planned to fake a Moon landing for the contestants, before settling on the aim of orbiting the Earth.

== Participants ==
- Andrew Carter, 19, a student from London.
- Sarah-Jane Cass, 19, a media studies student from Kent.
- Cheryl Dearie, 23, a housing association assistant (receptionist) from Glasgow.
- Paul French, 26, a plasterer from Bristol.
- Keri Hassett, 25, a college administrator from Birmingham.
- Billy Jackson, 25, a recruitment consultant from Kent.
- Ryan McBride, 28, an electrician living in London.
- Louise Nisbet, 23, a teacher from Whitstable.
- Astrid Roberts, 19, a call centre worker from Glamorgan.

French, Hassett and Jackson were chosen for the fake flight.

=== Actors ===
The three actor cadets were Charlie Skelton, Ranie Daw and Steve Hester. Hester dropped out on day three after a bout of gastroenteritis, after not completing the Cumbria outdoor auditions and after Skelton accidentally kicked his toenail off. Skelton, also a comedy writer, was chosen to take part in the flight.

The two pilots were improvisational actors, Alex Humes and Drew Leavy, who stayed in character the entire flight, even when alone.

Other cast

- Johnny Vaughan – writer, host
- Richard Campbell – Mission Commander
- Giles Boden – writer
- Michael Klesic – Dr. Vladimir Negovetic
- Valera Riazanov – physical instructor

Space Cadets – The Satellite Show cast

- Johnny Vaughan – writer
- Alex Zane – host
- Jeremy Edwards (Episode 1.1)
- Myleene Klass (Episodes 1.1, 1.2)
- Richard Campbell (all episodes)

=== Audition process ===
In order for the hoax to stand a realistic chance of succeeding, the Cadets would have to remain unaware of the true nature of the show, even given any production mistakes and implausible explanations. In a 2021 interview, Caudell stated that following consultation with psychologists the production team aimed to select "what are known as susceptible people; people who are intelligent, have a creative mind, like practical jokes, and want to go along with people".

=== Prize ===
All nine contestants won a genuine trip to Russia, including a trip to Star City (a small town to the north-west of Moscow which is the home to a Cosmonaut training facility); and a ride on a parabolic flight to experience weightlessness (known as a Vomit Comet) for around 25 seconds. In addition, each Cadet won a cash prize of £5,000. The three Cadets who went into 'space' won a cash prize of £25,000 each (£5,000 per "day in space").

== Comedic elements ==
The show contained moderate amounts of bizarre, surreal, or subversive show elements, in a manner similar to other Zeppotron-related productions (for example, TVGoHome.) Examples include:

- Cadet lectures that were "about 80% true", the rest being ludicrous rubbish; many of these lectures were of little practical use to cosmonauts (e.g. memory tests of the planets in the Solar System)
- Stereotyped characters, including a slow-talking Royal Air Force Squadron Leader with a luxuriant handlebar moustache
- Stupid training exercises (e.g. communications training involving reporting ever more implausible emergencies, ending with monkeys rampaging through the spacecraft, and Rambo giving The Fonz a high five)
- Nonsense Russian (e.g. having the Cadets salute a 'Russian Poem' which was actually the recipe for toad in the hole or having the Russian pilot wear makeup, place plastic spoons in his hair and insist the Cadets act out Alice in Wonderland)
- Nonsensical space experiments, including tests to make balloon animals
- The motto of the establishment S.T.A.R. is 'Это не ракетостроение'. The mission commander claimed this means 'We, the adventurers', but it actually means 'It's not rocket science', a phrase meaning that something is very easy, here taking on a double meaning.
- During the training lectures, the cadets were told that Russia's first cosmonaut to successfully orbit and return to earth was a monkey called Minsky (who is supposedly stuffed and kept on display at S.T.A.R.), and that the city of Minsk is named in her honour.
- According to one of the "pilots", if the shuttle was unable to land at the S.T.A.R. base in Russia, one of the back-up sites was at Woodbridge, UK. This is an in-joke as, unknown to the cadets, RAF Woodbridge was the 'twin' airbase to RAF Bentwaters. Woodbridge is also the nearest town to the actual Space Cadets production site in Suffolk.
- The cadets were also told the segments of Mission Control, referred to by acronyms, some of which are made up – CAPCOM, FlDO, LIDO, DIDO, NACAS and MUMI (only CAPCOM and FlDO are genuine positions).

=== Resolution ===
The show's ending occurred on the last day as planned. The Cadets had started to gain suspicions due to increasingly ludicrous set pieces (notably the space funeral of a fictional celebrity dog "Mr. Bimby", whose ashes were spilled and had to be vacuumed up). The Cadets were prepared for a spacewalk, but once in the module Vaughan showed them a montage of their suspicions, finishing with an outside shot of the simulator, which was the moment when the "cadets" knew they had not left the Earth. The module door was opened onto the studio set, complete with friends, family and the actors. Soon after, they were told they were in England, and had not actually even left the country.

=== Viewer reaction ===
Initial viewing figures were 2.6 million (11% share), dropping to 2 million; although Channel 4 was reported as being 'not disappointed' and the figures were in line with that time slot, and 42% of the viewers were the crucial 16- to 34-year-old segment.

Early viewer reaction to the show contained disbelief that such an apparently outlandish joke could be pulled off (the show claimed that Neil Armstrong had offered to eat his astronaut helmet if the show was successful).

Particularly questioned was how weightlessness, which would be present in a real space flight, would be handled on a ground-based set. The Cadets were told that they would be in "near space" (as opposed to "outer space"), causing only a 30% loss of gravity, which was compensated by "gravity generators" built into the ship; this highly erroneous explanation was believed.

== Location ==
The Space Cadets were initially assembled at Biggin Hill airfield, London, before being flown to Lydd. This air-hop would normally take just 15 minutes, but thanks to a specially convoluted flight plan over the North Sea it lasted four hours. Upon arrival at Lydd the cadets were told they had reached Volgograd. The Cadets had been relieved of their watches prior to the flight to prevent them noticing the absent time difference. They were then transferred by helicopter to RAF Bentwaters, Suffolk, which they had been led to believe was the Space Tourism Academy of Russia (STAR) facility in the town of Krymsk.

=== Training location ===
During the four-week period the Cadets were living on-site; their barracks and the academy building where they received their training are situated within the wooded dispersal area, which is on the south west of the airbase.

=== Simulator ===
The shuttle simulator was assembled in a soundproofed hangar which was constructed within RAF Bentwaters, c. 1991. The shuttle was given the name of Earth Orbiter 1 which was used as the spacecraft's call sign. The simulator was a wooden replica built by Wonderworks Inc. of Canoga Park, California for the film Deep Impact. The simulator also subsequently featured in Armageddon, Rocket's Red Glare, Space Cowboys and Battlestar Galactica: Blood & Chrome, as well as commercials for IBM and Slim Jims. As the Cadets spent five days inside the simulator, there was considerable attention and budget given to its plausibility, including extensive surround sound, pneumatic cushions, and a custom-built projector screen to display CGI graphics of the Earth's surface.

The hangar, called Hush House, is formed from insulated stainless steel walls and features an elaborate exhaust facility that enables the engines of jet aircraft such as the F-16 to be tested with minimal interruption to local residents and livestock. Hush House is situated south of the runway, towards the eastern edge of the site.

The entire hoax was almost revealed accidentally at the point of "launch". The sound system that was supposed to play the rocket engine noise at the point of take off failed. The actors playing the pilots desperately tried to communicate the failure to the producers, whilst remaining in character, by "aborting" the launch. Initially, there was no response to the failure by the producers as they were, themselves, caught up in the action. However, the lack of engine noise was fortunately explained away by one of the contestants, who suggested that it was a testament to the soundproofing of the shuttle crew bay. The sound system issue was corrected soon after and the engine noise suddenly returned, none of the contestants questioning the event.

== Cost ==
In total, the two programmes are together rumoured to have cost around £4.5m to produce, including prize payouts, the 6-month audition process, set making, staff salaries, and profits for Zeppotron.

== Psychological aspect ==
The show consistently raised the issue of how an immersive illusion can convince average people over a period of time, especially when reinforced as part of a group of believers – especially when this includes men in white coats and other authority figures. Outsiders (in this case, the viewers) see the hoax as laughable, yet 'inside' the Cadets have been slowly lulled into (as Vaughan stated) "what is, in effect, an alternative universe." Skelton, the actor Cadet on the 'mission', stated that it was easier to let himself believe the experience was genuine; trying to consciously remind himself of the hoax left him disorientated and "30% convinced, despite everything I know, that I am actually in space". Despite the fact that he was aware of the nature of the hoax, Skelton later stated that "for about a month (after the end of the show), I thought I was on camera all the time. I would wake up at night and think there were cameras in the corner of the room. It was quite disturbing".

Parallels can be drawn to the supposed 'group experiment' element of Big Brother which Space Cadets draws on, and in wider terms propaganda, subliminal advertising, and the consensus nature of reality. See also: Asch conformity experiments, Milgram experiment and the Stanford prison experiment.

== 'Double hoax' theory ==
As the attention to detail in the hoaxed environment became clear, some viewers expressed suspicions – in particular on Channel 4's message board for the programme – that the entire show, including the apparent gullibility and abject ignorance of the Cadets, was in fact a double bluff; all the Cadets were actors and that the real target of "the biggest prank in television history" was the "gullible" viewing public. The theories were lent considerable credibility when Ryan McBride was sighted in a TV advert for blood donation, although he later explained he was recruited as an extra on-location and was not a professional actor. Variations on this "conspiracy theory" included the actor Cadets being unaware of the hoax; that each Cadet believed themselves to be the only actor; or that the actors/Cadets believed the viewers thought the space mission was genuine. One conspiracy theory even went as far as to suggest a real trip into space could be awarded to one of the unsuspecting actor Cadets, possibly using a company like Virgin Galactic or Space Adventures for the prize. Once the programme reached its end these suspicions proved to be unfounded.

== See also ==
- Capricorn One
