= Recruiting metrics =

Measurements used when hiring employees

Recruitment metrics are a standard set of measurements used to manage and improve the process of hiring candidates into an organization. Candidates can be existing employees within an organization, people entering the workforce for the first time or employees interested in job opportunities outside their current organization.

Many recruitment metrics are used by organizations to gain valuable insights on potential candidates during the recruitment process:

- Identification of candidates, sometimes known as sourcing personnel.
- Attraction of candidates.
- Interviewing and assessment of candidates.
- Overall process improvement of the recruiting workflow and steps.

== Standard Recruitment Metrics ==
Time-to-hire refers to the time between a job candidate applying and accepting an offer. In a competitive job market, time-to-hire may be prolonged as candidates mull their options. In 2019, the United States Office of Personnel Management started requiring time-to-hire metrics for all new federal hires.

Source of hire is a recruitment metric identifying the specific channel, platform, or method through which a company recruited an employee. These include in-person recruitment fairs, online job boards, social media, and employee referrals. The metric enables entities to optimize their hiring strategies. There are a number of mediums through which candidates may be recruited, such as advertisements, job fair, online and in-person job boards, recruiter, referral, and walk-in.

Quality of hire is a metric assessing the value a new employee. It is a reflection of performance, contributions, adaptability, and personality fit. The metric is difficult to define and assess.

Cost per hire is a human resource metric that reflects the cost of a new employee. The cost per hire does not always reflect the loss of productivity and the emotional toll of turnover.

=== Speed Metrics ===
Metric Type	Definition	Formula
Time to Fill (TTF)	The time it takes to identify and recruit a candidate or an existing employee to fill a vacant position within an organization. Fill is defined as the step in the recruiting process where the candidate has cleared the background and/or reference checks and has joined the company. This metric is generally used for the calculation and measurement of hiring external candidates vs. existing internal employees within an organization.	The clock starts on the metric calculation the moment the requisition is approved by the hiring organization. The clock stops on the metric calculation the moment the candidate clears the background and, if necessary, reference checks.
Time to Accept (TTA)	The time it takes to identify and recruit a candidate or existing employee to accept a position within an organization. Accept is defined as the verbal or written acceptance of the job position being presented	The difference in time between the moment the requisition is approved by the hiring organization and when the candidate accepts the verbal or written job offer.
Time to Start (TTS)	The time it takes to identify and recruit a candidate or existing employee to start in the new position that they have accepted within an organization.	The clock starts on the metric's calculation the moment the requisition is approved by the hiring organization and stops based on the candidate's target or real start date.
Recruiting vs Business Consideration (RvB)	Compares how many business days the recruiting function takes to identify and screen the candidate vs how many business days the hiring manager takes to interview and choose a candidate.	The first part of the calculation begins the moment the requisition is approved and stops once the recruiting function submits a candidate to the hiring organization for consideration and review. The second part of the metric is measured by the time between the business's decision to hire the candidate, and the candidate's acceptance of the job offer.
Time in Workflow Step (TWS)	Time a candidate spends in each of the workflow step of the Applicant Tracking System (ATS) in business days. Examples of standard ATS step are: Candidate Application; Recruiter Screening; Submission to Hiring Manager and review; Initial interviews(s); Final Interview; Offer; Background Checks; Hire.	This calculation calculates the difference between when a candidate first enters a workflow step and when that candidate leaves that workflow step. Example: Candidate applies to a job opening on January 1 and then is moved by a recruiter to the Recruiter Screen workflow step in the ATS on January the 4th. The time in the candidate application step is tabulated as 4 days.
Applicant Cycle Time (ACT)	The time a candidate spends in the selection process for an opening. This metric only measures the successfully hired candidate and does not account for any other candidates. It is a good measure of the efficiency of the recruiting team once a qualified candidate is identified.	Shown in days, it is the difference in time between the successful candidate's application submission and the moment the candidate accepts the verbal or written job offer.

=== Quality Metrics ===
Metric Type	Definition	Formula
Submissions to Business Acceptance Percentage (SBA)	Number of candidates that are submitted to the business by the recruiting function over the requirements of the position that are accepted by the business as a percentage	Example: Recruiting function submits 10 candidates to the business against the requirements of the role and the business accepts 7 that they will move forward to the next step of the recruiting workflow. SBA = 70%
First Year Quality (FYQ)	Compares a quality data point on the recruiting functions ability to present a quality number of candidates to the business/organization for consideration as a percentage of those that the business accepts to proceed forward in the recruiting workflow process in combination with the organization's ability to retain candidates that have started their new position and are still with the organization after their first twelve months of employment. Attrition is defined as employees who have left the organization either a) On their own accord or b) Were terminated from employment from that organization within the first twelve months of employment. Also referred to unmanaged or managed attrition.	Number of candidates submitted to the business from the recruiting function that they accept as a percentage (SBA Metric)+ percentage of candidates that do not leave in their first twelve months of employment divided by these two data points. Example: Data Point 1: Recruiter submits 10 candidates to the business who accepts 8 = 80% submission quality (SBA). Data Point 2: In the previous fiscal year, 10% of candidates hired left the organization within their first year of employment = 90% Retention. 80% + 90% = 170 divided by two data point indicators = 85% First Year Quality (FYQ)
Offer Acceptance Rate (OA)	Compares the number of candidates that are presented a written or verbal job offer vs the percentage of candidates that accept the job offer	Number of candidates presented the offer who accept the offer as a percentage. Example: 10 Candidates are presented a job offer with 8 accepting the job offer = an 80% OA
Submission to Hire Ratio (SHR)	A calculation that determines the number of candidates that are submitted to the business to produce a hire as a ratio. The more effective the recruiting function is as submitting quality candidates against the position requirement the lower the SHR ratio will be.	Number of candidates that are submitted to the business for consideration divided by the number of hires as a ratio output metric. Example: Recruiting function submits 9 candidates to the business to review against the position requirements resulting in 1 hire. SBA = 9:1
Application Drop off Rate (ADR)	A percentage metric to determine the quality of the candidate application process and experience. A good candidate application experience should determine a higher percentage of candidates starting and completing the application process	The ratio of the number of candidates that start the job application and the number of candidates that complete the online application as a percentage. Example: 100 candidates start an application for a position but only 40 complete the application process. ADR = 60%
Hiring Manager Satisfaction	A standard set of questions that gets asked of Hiring Managers within an organization by the Recruiting function on their level of satisfaction around some or all of the following: Overall experience working with the recruiting function during the hiring process; Quality of candidates submitted; Speed and responsiveness; Value added to guide and help the business through the hiring process	Variations exists in how organizations produce a measurement of outcome from the overall scoring system being used from leveraging a net promoter score approach to a Likert Scale approach of 1 to 7, with 1 being extremely satisfied to 7 being extremely dissatisfied.
Candidate Satisfaction	A standard set of questions that gets asked of candidates during or after the hiring process about their level of satisfaction around some or all of the following: Overall experience working with the organization during the hiring process; Overall experience working with the recruiting function during the hiring process; Satisfaction with the technology and experience used during the application process; Speed and responsiveness; Value added to guide and help the candidate through the hiring process	Variations exists in how organizations produce a measurement of outcome from the overall scoring system being used from leveraging a net promoter score approach to a Likert Scale approach of 1 to 7, with 1 being extremely satisfied to 7 being extremely dissatisfied.

=== Productivity Metrics ===
Metric Type	Definition	Formula
Source of Application (SoA)	A recruiting metric to help determine the value of potential investments made by an organization in each of their different initiatives around the attraction of candidates applying their job opportunities. Each of these initiates are traditionally grouped into candidate source categories in an Applicant Tracking System (ATS). Examples of traditional candidate source of application categories are: Employee Referrals; Job Boards; Organization's Career pages; Social Media; 3rd Party Staffing Agencies; Career Fairs; Internal Employment sites	Total number of candidate applications as a percentage, grouped by source category. Example: During a 12-month period, an organization had 5,000 candidates apply to their positions, where 1,000 of those candidate applications came from Job boards. Job boards provided 20% of the applications.
Source of Hire (SoH)	A recruiting metric to help determine the value of potential investments made by an organization in each of their different initiatives that ultimately leads to a candidate being hired. Each of these initiates is traditionally grouped into candidate source categories in an Applicant Tracking System (ATS). Examples of traditional candidate source of application categories are: Employee Referrals; Job Boards; The organization's Career pages; Social Media; 3rd Party Staffing Agencies; Career Fairs; Internal Employment sites	Total number of candidates hired as a percentage broken out by percentage of each source category. Example: For a 12-month period an organization had 1,000 candidates hired to their positions where 300 of those candidate applications came from Employee Referrals. Employee referrals influenced 30% of the applications.
Full Funnel Throughput (FFT)	Similar to the Submit to Hire Ratio (SHR), this ratio metric as a calculation to determine the overall effectiveness of each step of the recruiting workflow, also referred to as the recruiting funnel throughput. An example of major ATS workflow steps and each sequential workflow step [Applications: Recruiter Screen: Submittal to Hiring Manager: Business Interviews: Final Interview: Offer: Background Checks: Hire]. The power of this metric comes into play when you start evaluating the Funnel Throughput efficiencies of multiple requisitions by certain groupings to determine an average by workflow step for that sample group. An example of sample groups: Similar job family positions; Positions in certain geographies; Positions in different organizational business units; Positions by recruiters; Positions grouped by hiring managers. The power of this metric comes into play when you start evaluating the year by year comparisons and/or multiple requisitions by certain groupings to determine an average by workflow step for that sample group.	The metric's calculation determines how many candidates enter the first step of the recruiting workflow divided by how many candidates proceed to the next sub sequential step of the recruiting workflow as a ratio. . Example: For one position receives 1,000 Applications that leads to 100 Recruiter Screens which results in 20 candidate submissions to the hiring manager, resulting in 10 interviews and 5 final interviews making 1 offer resulting in 1 hire. The FFT Metrics, in this case, would look like this: 10:1 (1,000 applications to 100 recruiter screens); 5:1 (100 recruiter screens to 20 submissions); 2:1 (20 submissions to 10 hiring manager acceptances); 1:1 (10 hiring manager acceptances to 10 business interviews); 2:1 (10 business interviews to 5 final interviews); 5:1 (5 final interviews to 1 offer); 1:1 (1 offer to 1 hire)
Candidate Withdrawal Reasons (CWR)	A metric calculating why candidates do not want to proceed forward with during the interview process against a requisition. The outcome is a grouping of common reasons why candidates are not interested in proceeding. Examples of potential candidate withdrawal reasons: Too much travel required; Base salary too low; Organization's benefits package; Relocation; Role requirements not motivating enough; Organization's external brand. This is useful to assist organizations in determining trends that indicate areas that need improvement. Example comparison groupings: Similar job family positions; Positions in certain geographies; Positions in different organizational business units; Positions by recruiters; Positions grouped by hiring managers	Total number of candidates who withdrew from the recruiting process as a percentage breakout by each of the candidates withdrew groupings. Example: 500 candidates withdrew from sales positions for an organization in a fiscal year.: 150 (30%) said too much travel required; 100 (20%) said base salary too low; 20 (4%) said Organization's benefits package; 80 (16%) Relocation; 100 (20%) Role requirements were not motivating enough; 50 (10%) Organization's external brand
Req Cancellation Rate (RCR)	A metric that determines how much time as an overall percentage is spent by the recruiting function working on requisitions that get canceled vs the time spent on requisitions that get filled. A high percentage of time spent by a recruiting function working on positions that get canceled creates inefficiencies in the organization's recruiting process.	Total number of filled requisitions plus canceled requisitions that are worked on during a fiscal year divided by the number of those requisitions that are canceled. Example: A recruitment process fills 5,000 requisitions a year with an additional 1,250 requisitions being canceled. RCR = 20%
New vs Replacement Req Type (NvR)	Similar to the RCR: how much time as an overall percentage is spent by recruitment working on requisitions that are net new growth positions for an organization vs time spent on requisitions that are backing an existing position where the employee left the role.	Total number of requisitions that are created during a fiscal year that are net new growth positions as a percentage out of 100 vs the percentage of requisitions that are created that are backfilling an employee. Example: 10,000 requisitions are created in a fiscal year where 6,000 (60%) are net new growth positions vs 4,000 (40%) are backfilling and employee.

=== Cost Metrics ===
Metric Type	Definition	Formula
Recruiting Resources Cost to Acquire (CTA)	A metric that identifies the total cost of recruiting resources that are required by an organization to fill all the requisitions in a fiscal year. Note: This metric is a simpler derivative of total Cost Per Hire metrics that try to capture all recruiting related expenses and investments involved in hiring candidates.	A recruiting department's total resource costs, including full-time employees, contractors, and temps, divided by number of candidates hired for a fiscal year. Example: An organization spends 1 million dollars a year on total resource costs and they fill 400 requisitions in a fiscal year. 1 million divided by 400, CTA = $2,500

== Variations on Metrics ==
1. Time based metrics can be measured in business or calendar days related to the nature of the hiring organization. Example: Hospitals may hire on weekends, so time based metrics being measured in calendar days will potentially give more insight. However, more traditional organizations are better served by measuring time based metrics with business days.

== See also ==
- Recruitment
- Applicant Tracking System
- Candidate Submittal
- Sourcing (personnel)
