= Francis Augustus Cox =

English writer and Baptist minister

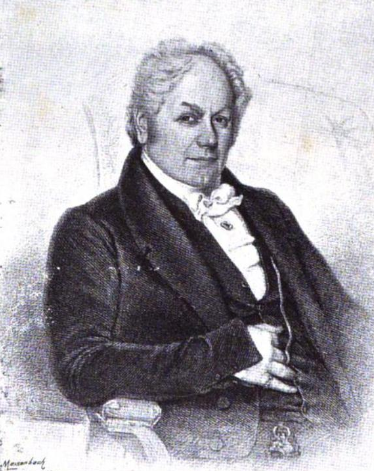
- Born: 1783; Leighton Buzzard, Bedfordshire, Kingdom of Great Britain
- Died: 1853; Hackney, England, United Kingdom of Great Britain and Ireland
- Occupation(s): Baptist Preacher, Writer
- Known for: History of the Baptists
- Spouse(s): Elizabeth King of Watford in 1809; Sarah Savery in 1821; Hephzibah Hannah Finch Jones in 1847.
- Children: seven

Francis Augustus Cox (1783–1853) was a prominent English Baptist minister. He began preaching in his teens, before training, and was then a minister for over forty years in Hackney.

Cox was an active supporter of the formation of the University of London. He published numerous articles including a book of women's biographies and a history of the Baptist Missionary Society.

== Biography ==
Cox was born in Leighton Buzzard in 1783 and he was baptised at the age of twelve. After some early preaching as a teenager, schooling in Northampton and receipt of a substantial inheritance from his grandfather he attended the Baptist College in Bristol. Cox became a Baptist minister after graduating with an MA from the University of Edinburgh.

In 1805 he was appointed minister in Clipston in Northamptonshire, before taking up a position at the St Andrew's Street Church in Cambridge which dates from 1764. However Cox resigned in 1808 and returned to Clipston.

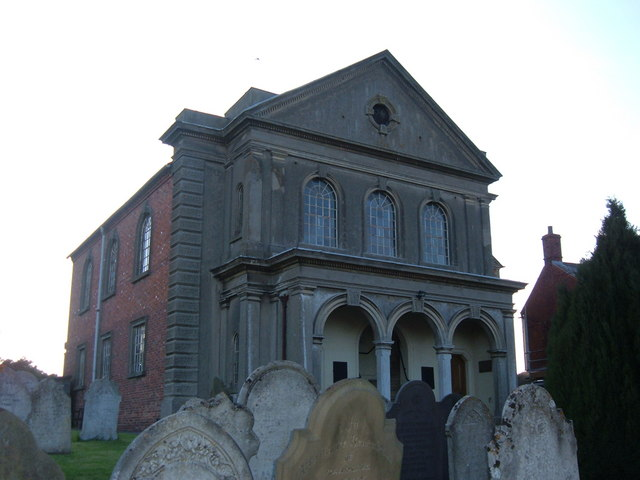
Clipston Chapel where Cox returned to in April 1808

His congregation for 42 years was in Hackney where his church was eventually at Mare Street. He had only agreed to preach there temporarily but he and the church were happy with his work. The congregation grew by a factor of six while he was there and notable people attended.

When the University of London was founded in 1828, he was prevented from being on its committee because he was a minister. However he was made the librarian at the University for a short while.

He served as secretary of the Protestant Society for three years; and in a group of Protestant Dissenting Ministers.

He served on the committee for Repeal of the Test and Corporation Acts which led to the Sacramental Test Act 1828, removing restrictions on non-conformist Protestants. That was followed by the Roman Catholic Relief Act 1829, which allowed Catholics to serve in parliament. In 1832 Cox was involved in trying to save the British and Foreign Seaman and Soldiers' Friend Society following a public scandal but resigned shortly after his appointment.

Cox received an LLD degree from the University of Glasgow through his friendship with Lord Brougham and he was later made a Docter of Divinity by the "University of Waterville" whilst on a visit to America on behalf of the Baptists in 1838. In the same year he attended the opening of a school to educate the daughters of missionaries started by Dorothea Foulger.

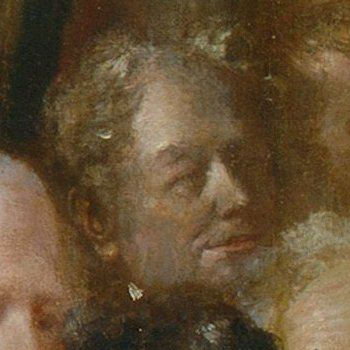
in 1840 in the crowd at the 1840 anti-slavery convention

Two years later, Cox attended the 1840 British and Foreign Anti-Slavery Society convention in London and he was included in the painting which is now in the National Portrait Gallery in London.

Cox died in 1858 in Hackney, having been married three times and fathering seven children. His body of published work was immense. He founded the Baptist Magazine in 1809 and wrote extensively for it. As late as 1852 he had contributed an article on Palestinian Biblical antiquities to the Encyclopædia Metropolitana. Two volumes of biographies of women in the Bible, a history of the Baptist Missionary Society and a life of Philip Melanchthon are some of his major works.
