= Walthamstow Hall =

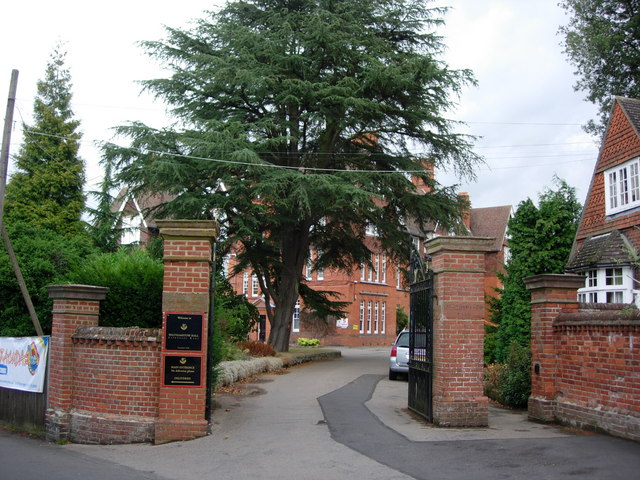

Location
- Holly Bush Lane; Sevenoaks, Kent, TN13 3UL; United Kingdom; 51.27898°N 0.19787°E

Information
- Type: Private day school
- Motto: Non Palma Sine Pulvere
- Religious affiliation: non-denominational
- Established: 1838
- Founder: Dorothea Foulger
- Local authority: Kent
- Department for Education URN: 119002 Tables
- Headmistress: Louise Chamberlain
- Gender: Girls
- Age: 2 to 18
- Enrolment: 590~
- Houses: Chartwell; Penshurst; Quebec; Montreal; Down; Knole
- Website: http://www.walthamstow-hall.co.uk

Walthamstow Hall is a private day school for girls in the centre of Sevenoaks, Kent, England. It was founded by Dorothea Foulger as a school for the daughters of missionaries in 1838.

== History ==
Walthamstow Hall was founded in 1838 and is one of the oldest all-girl independent schools in the country. Dorothea Foulger founded the school as an inter-denominational mission school and home for the daughters of Christian missionaries. It provides an 'all-through' education with a Junior School for girls aged 2–11 and a Senior School for girls aged 11–18. The school is named after the village of Walthamstow where it was founded. In 1838 the village was five miles from London. It moved to the site in Holly Bush Lane, Sevenoaks on 17 May 1882. Sevenoaks was where Foulger's daughter, Mary Anne Lydia Pye-Smith, lived. Pye-Smith was a strong supporter of the school.

In 1838 five girls sat on five wooden stools made for them at the opening meeting of the school and home for missionaries' daughters in Marsh Street, Walthamstow. Foulger was founder and benefactor of the school and created the first band of helpers to set up the school and care for the children of missionaries working in remote places including India and China. The school was the first of its kind in the country and daughters of all evangelical missionaries were received, including the Church Missionary Society until it opened its own school.

Subjects taught included reading, writing, accounts, English, history, geography, and Latin. Languages and sciences were considered important as girls were expected to enter the missionary service in later years and eighteen were missionaries and another 37 married missionaries in the first 40 years.

Male students were sent to The School for the Sons of Missionaries (founded in 1842 by Mr Foulger in Walthamstow, Dr Bell's in Stockwell in 1852, to Blackheath in 1857 and then Eltham College in 1912) set up under similar circumstances.

In 1873 three Walthamstow Hall pupils were entered for the Cambridge Examination for the first time. Two passed and one with honours. The next year, a student called Mary Wallis received Lady Goldsmith's Latin Prize, a distinction attained by only 15 girls in England.

From just five girls in 1838 the school expanded rapidly and despite many building extensions and leasing of the adjoining property it was obvious that the site was not big enough and the waiting list increased. Walthamstow was no longer a country village as the railway had arrived.

John and Dorothy Foulger's daughter Mary Anne Lydia Pye-Smith lived in Sevenoaks, and that became the site for the building of the new school. The architect was Edward C Robins (the same firm which built Caterham School in 1880). The foundation stone was laid at Sevenoaks on 26 June 1878 by W E Forster, MP. Four years later in 1882 the building was completed, and the school community moved in.

The same year the girls moved into their new Sevenoaks home; two whole classes were sent up for the Cambridge examinations. Leavers in the late 19th century gained places and scholarships at universities.

The school was recognised in 1903. Girls had been taking the Cambridge Examinations, but Miss Hare invited an inspection by the University of London so that their examinations could be taken instead. This evolved to become one General School Examination. In 1904 the Gymnasium then called the 'Play-Room' was opened in the same year that daygirls were first admitted.

Walthamstow Hall and Eltham College, in a similar circumstance, made a successful Joint Church Appeal for £10,000 in 1921. They had the backing of the two Missionary Societies. Negotiations with the Board of Education resulted in the receipt of a Government Grant. Euphemia Leys Ramsay was appointed as Miss Hare's successor as head in 1922. Today the school holds a 'Ramsay Occasion' in her memory when a distinguished lecturer from the world of the Arts/Media is invited.

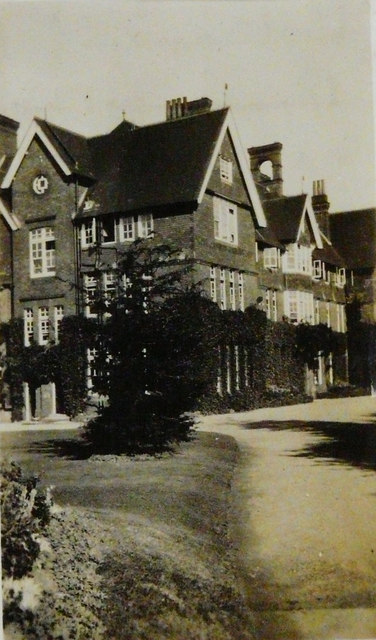
Walthamstow Hall in about 1932

From 1940 to 1945 Walthamstow Hall was in the battle zone of the Second World War. On the night of 21 September 1940 when the new laboratory, craft rooms and old gymnasium were destroyed by bombs and damage caused to the whole school but no one was hurt.

Sevenoaks was in a reception area and the school became a clearing home for evacuees, first for mothers and babies. It also became an Air Raid Wardens' Post and members of staff shared a rota each night fire-watching. During school-time raids, lessons and exams went on in the trenches which had been built in the grounds with the children sitting on their bunks.

The flying bombs posed the greatest menace - one speech day took place partly underground until the skies cleared.

Miss Ramsay arranged to evacuate the Junior Boarders and younger day girls to Attingham Park near Shrewsbury (shared temporarily with girls from Edgbaston Girls School in Birmingham) near to where Miss Blackburn taught and arranged regular three weeks' visits with specialist teachers dispatched to supervise the work. They moved to Pontesford House, 9 miles from Shrewsbury and stayed there until 1944.

V.E. Day celebrations in 1946 were enjoyed and the school's close links with France re-established. The first French Assistante to be appointed since the war was celebrated with a French play in which Miss Ramsay had a starring role. Later that year she retired and was succeeded by Emmeline Blackburn, one of Miss Ramsay's old scholars.

In 1968 the headmistress reported to the governors that the Ordinary Level results were 'phenomenal' and in 1971 Oxbridge places were achieved in Geography, Medicine, French and German, History, English (2), Biology and French and Latin. In 1970, Brentor, a house in Vine Court Road was opened as a Sixth Form Centre and named E. B. H. in honour of Miss Blackburn who was about to celebrate 24 successful years as headmistress.

In 1976 Walthamstow Hall Friends Trust was launched (now Walthamstow Hall Friends and Parents, WHFP). The association has provided The Friends and Parents' Bursary Scheme since then.

The buildings and grounds were developed steadily during the 1970s with generous gifts from an Eltham Old Boy, Mr. Dudley Witting who made possible the development of a new suite of language rooms and major developments at the Junior School. Fund-raising made possible the building of The Eric Salmon Wing, opened in 1975, which houses art studios, teaching suites, ICT and Junior Careers. This was named after the chairman of the governors. The last development during Miss Davies' custodianship was the building of the squash courts opened in 1984.

Computer Studies became a firm addition in 1979 thanks to the improved facilities and equipment. Work experience was introduced in 1984 for upper four (Year 9) and in 1987 a special link with Liberty's was created which provided management placements. Language students visit Germany and France to stay with 'exchange' families whilst they work for local businesses.

The school's aims have always been to produce a balanced and rounded education with a timetable which offers a full spread of subjects for all pupils until the end of the Year 9. Chosen subjects for IGCSE are studied in Years 10 & 11 culminating in students achieving high grades in ten or more subjects. 'Twilight GCSEs' have been offered since 1995 after school in Years 10 and 11.

A combination of four A Levels/Cambridge Pre-U is the norm in Sixth Form. Students are not restricted by pre-determined subject blocks.

In 1989 the Ship Theatre was opened by Sir Geraint Evans. 'The Ship' is a purpose-built performing art building which houses a theatre with 'thrust' stage and seating for 199, as well as practise and 'green rooms' for both music and drama departments. 'The Ship Festival' was held to commemorate the opening and has taken place every five years since. The theatre was refurbished to commemorate the school's 175th anniversary in the summer of 2013.

The Christian ethos of the school is never far from the day's agenda, and girls elect the organisations and events they wish to support each term.

== School motto ==
The school's motto is Non Palma Sine Pulvere (No reward without effort).

== Notable former pupils ==
- Janet Kear, ornithologist
- Kathryn Colvin, diplomat
- Dr Beverley J Hunt, professor of thrombosis and haemostasis at King's College, London
- Rowan Pelling, journalist
- Janine Gibson, Editor of Buzzfeed UK
- Margaret Turner-Warwick, physician and first female president of the Royal College of Physicians.
