= Dorothea Foulger =

British missionary supporter and school founder (1787–1852)

- Born: 1787; St George in the East
- Died: 6 May 1852 (aged 64–65); Walthamstow

Dorothea Foulger born Dorothea Rutherford (1787 – 1852) was a British missionary supporter and school founder. She started Walthamstow Hall school for missionaries' daughters and she played a key part in creating Eltham College for boys.

== Life ==
Foulger was born in 1787 (maybe in November) in the London parish of St George-in-the-East. Her mother was Lydia Rebecca (born Duplex) and her father was Dr John Rutherford.

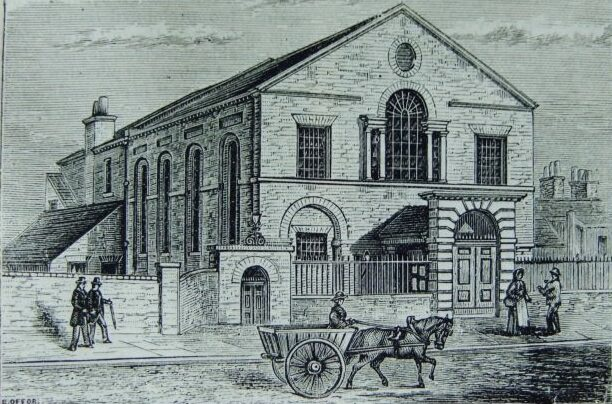
Their church was Walthamstow High Street Primitive Methodist chapel (pictured in 1900)

She married John Foulger who was an oil merchant working in the city and they had three children before they started to live in Walthamstow where she and John attended the Congregational Chapel. Her husband owned a major share in the Abney Park Cemetery Company and he served on the board of the London Missionary Society.

The Foulgers provided respite for missionaries resting from their work abroad. She listened to their concerns including their worries over the education of their children. She wrote to the London Missionary Society, but they reassured her that the existing facilities were adequate. Dorothea was not placated and she started what would become Walthamstow Hall school for missionaries' daughters. In 1837 a committee was created following an advert in the Evangelical Magazine to create "a home of the children while under its care". "Mrs John Foulger was the prime mover". When the school had its official opening it was attended by William Ellis who was the LMS's secretary, the minister and abolitionist Dr. Francis Augustus Cox, Dr. Andrew Reed and the linguist (later Professor) James Legge.

The school taught the girls a wide range of subjects but Latin was included to make sure that they understood linguistics and the structure of words. The school intended that the students, like their parents, would be missionaries. The results were that in the time up to 1878, 18 of their students became missionaries, 37 married missionaries and 57 others became teachers.

== Death and legacy ==
Her husband died in 1850 and she died in 1852. The Congregational chapel that they attended in Walthamstow had a memorial plaque to her and her husband. However the chapel was later demolished. The schools that she was involved with, Walthamstow Hall and Eltham College, were still operating in 2023. She was buried in Abney Park Cemetery, Stoke Newington.
