= Staffing =

Recruiting appropriate workers to job positions

Staffing is the process of finding the right worker with appropriate qualifications or experience and recruiting them to fill a job position or role. Through this process, organizations acquire, deploy, and retain a workforce of sufficient quantity and quality to create positive impacts on the organization's effectiveness. In management, staffing is an operation of recruiting the employees by evaluating their skills and knowledge before offering them specific job roles accordingly.

Recruitment involves the use of multiple sourcing strategies. Job boards such as LinkedIn and Indeed are commonly used to reach a broad pool of candidates, while social media platforms, including Facebook and Twitter, can facilitate engagement with potential applicants. In addition, organizational career pages provide a dedicated platform for advertising vacancies and receiving applications. A staffing model is a data set that measures work activities, how many labor hours are needed, and how employee time is spent.

== Importance ==
Staffing helps to find and hire people who are qualified for the job position and will benefit the company. It also improves the quality and quantity of work done by the company because they have staffed the optimum people. Job satisfaction rates are likely to increase because everyone is well-suited for their position and is happy to be doing their specialty of work. Higher rates of productive performance from the company are also common, as they have staffed the right people to do their jobs. It provides employees the opportunity for further growth and development.

== Quantity and quality ==
Staffing an organization focuses on both the quality and the quantity of the staff.

The quantity is the number of staff. The organization forecasts workforce quantity requirements and then compares it to the available workforce. If the headcount matches the requirement, then the organization is fully staffed. If the requirement exceeds the number of available employees, then the organization is understaffed. If the available staff exceeds the requirements, then the organization is overstaffed and may need to stop hiring and layoff employees. When a company is understaffed, the staffing process may restart.

The quality is having the right person for the job. The right person should have a job and an organization match. The job match involves the employee's knowledge, skills, abilities, and other characteristics and how they work with the job's tasks. The organization match is when the person has the same organizational values as the organization.

== Core staffing activities ==
Human resource management (HRM) encompasses a spectrum of functions and activities aimed at managing an organization's workforce effectively. Core staffing activities are integral components of HRM, focusing on the acquisition and management of human resources within an organization. These activities are fundamental in building and maintaining a skilled and motivated workforce. The five core staffing activities are recruitment, selection, employment, training and retention.

=== Recruitment ===
Recruitment serves as the foundation of an effective staffing system. Unlike the private sector, where profit motives often drive hiring decisions, the public sector focuses on providing essential public services. A well-executed recruitment process is instrumental in identifying, attracting. and engaging potential candidates who possess the requisite qualifications and characteristics to excel in specific job roles. Key components of recruitment include:

==== Goals and job descriptions ====
Prior to initiating the recruitment process, organizations must define clear goals and job descriptions. This entails evaluating positions and job categories by conducting a thorough examination known as job analysis, which is a comprehensive procedure for documenting and defining job roles and tasks. Job analysis is widely regarded as a fundamental component of successful HRM, and it holds particular significance in staffing processes such as recruitment and selection, where it helps gauge the extent of job performance. It centers on delineating the job's duties, obligations, necessary expertise, skills, and other essential attributes needed to execute the role.

==== Internal vs. external recruitment ====
Organizations face a critical decision regarding whether to recruit internally or externally. Internal recruitment involves filling a vacancy from within the existing workforce, promoting loyalty and potentially reducing costs. However, it may limit innovation and leave gaps in the workforce. External recruitment, on the other hand, seeks candidates outside the organization, increasing the chances of recruiting experienced and qualified individuals. Yet, external recruits may lack a deep understanding of the company culture, and internal disputes may arise.

Depending on the chosen recruitment approach, organizations can employ various communication strategies. In an open recruitment system, all employees are notified about job openings and are given the opportunity to apply. In a closed recruitment system, only specific employees are informed about the vacancy. A hybrid recruitment system combines elements of both open and closed recruitment.

==== Sourcing candidates ====
. It is important to collaborate with external agencies broadens the talent pool.

=== Selection ===
Selection holds significant importance within the staffing procedure, as mishandling it may result in the organization missing out on potential candidates. The primary aim of the selection process is to assess whether a candidate is a suitable fit for employment within the organization or not.

- Candidate evaluation: This process starts with the review of the job applications, résumés, and cover letters of the job candidates. During the reviewing of candidates, initial screening is an important aspect too. As part of evaluating a candidate, testing include personality, ability, and intelligence tests can be undertaken.
- Interviews:' Interviews are vital for HR professionals to assess candidates. Behavioral interviews focus on past experiences to predict future performance. Technical interviews evaluate candidates' skills. Panel interviews involve multiple interviewers, providing diverse perspectives. These methods help in comprehensive candidate evaluation.
- Contingent assessment: Depending on the organization, this is the last step. It includes drug tests and medical exams. The final step may encompass drug tests and medical exams to ensure candidates meet specific health and safety requirements.

=== Standards for recruitment and selection ===
When staffing, mainly for the public sector, recruitment and selection processes are distinctive due to the heightened importance of transparency, accountability, and alignment with public values. These processes are often subject to intense public scrutiny, necessitating a commitment to transparency in all stages of sourcing, evaluation, and selection. to ensure that candidates are assessed solely on their qualifications and competencies, thereby mitigating personal connections or favoritism. Below are some of them:

- Merit based selection: This is an important standard to ensure that candidates are evaluated based on qualifications and competencies rather than personal connections or favoritism.
- Alignment with organizational values: Candidates in the public sector are typically assessed for their alignment with public service principles, commitment to transparency, and ability to make decisions in the public interest.
- Diversity and inclusion: Public sector recruitment efforts place a strong emphasis on diversity and inclusion to ensure that the government workforce reflects the diverse populations it serves.

=== Employment ===
Employment is the process of hiring the individual who was selected in the selection process. The organization should first propose a job offer, which typically includes starting date, duration of the contract, compensation, starting rate, benefits, and hours of the position. The organization then prepares for the new employee's arrival. Ideally, the company should make sure that the employee has all of the tools required to do their job effectively, such as security badges, keys, and any other technology.

=== Training ===
After the selection of an employee, the employee receives training. With the various technological changes in modern history, the need for training employees is increased to keep the employees in touch with the various new developments. Staffing can be influenced by how staffers are trained and the type of training they receive.

Training is generally classified into two types, on the job and off the job. Some examples of training programs include:

- Technical training – training that teaches employees about a particular technology or a machine.
- Quality training – trains employees to identify faulty products.
- Skills training – training that is given to employees to perform their particular jobs.
- Soft skills – personality development
- Team training – training establishes a level of trust and synchronicity between team members for increased efficiency.

==== Training associated with High-Performance Work System (HPWS) perspective ====
A scenario in the U.S Federal Workforce suggested that High-Performance Work System (HPWS) perspective is a theoretical framework, that discovers the connections between human resource practices and organisational outcomes. Significantly, HPWS focuses on the belief that effective HR practices within an organisation implementation will fabricate a workforce that compromised both effective and efficient employees with the qualities of trained, motivated, and dedicated. HPWSs are composed of interrelated HR practices (HPWPs) that are used to cultivate employees' talents and skills and ultimately apply their abilities to their work, which encourage positive organisational outcomes such as motivation, dedication, and retention. Training and development opportunities are one such HPWP that is explored further. The efficacy of a HPWS increases when multiple HPWPs are administered simultaneously in bundles. Some HPWPs include efficient recruitment and selection, enhanced training and development, and competitive compensation and incentives.

==== Training vs job demand and resources ====
The Job Demand-Resources (JD-R) model is a theoretical framework that explains how job demands and job resources can impact employee well-being and work engagement. In this model, training and development is considered a job resource that can buffer the impact of job demands and increase rates of work engagement. Even though training and development is contemplated a job resource in the JD-R model, relatively few studies examine whether having access to training and developmental opportunities buffer the impact of job demands and rocket rates of work engagement, especially on a sample from the federal workforce. Studies have connected training to work outcomes and have seen its positive effects on employees. These outcomes include four increased rates of (i)positive efficacy, (ii)job satisfaction, (iii)job performance, and (iv)organisational performance. Moreover, access training, as a job resource, positively correlates with work engagement and negatively correlates with burnout and turnover.

==== Training implementation beliefs ====
- Self-efficacy is an individual belief in their ability to perform a specific task or achieve a specific goal. It is the passion and mentality that an individual has and to head on all the challenges faced while striving to accomplish target goals. Individuals with high self-efficacy are more motivated and committed to transferring the learned skills to their workplace. In short, self-efficacy is having the 'I can do it' belief.
- Instrumentality/utility is an individual's perception of the usefulness of training activities. Perception could be based on how employees interpret different sensations. When trainees attach value to training activities, they are more likely to be motivated to learn and apply the learned skills in their jobs. In short, instrumentality is having the 'I will do it' belief.

For instance, an individual who has the passion and competence to do their job is more likely to enjoy it. They might bring more and better ideas for improvement and innovation to the workplace, than someone who isn't interested. The latter will be inclined to look busy doing insignificant tasks to pass the time, rather than productive work.

Therefore, both beliefs are significant predictors of training implementation behaviours as individuals with high self-efficacy and high instrumentality beliefs are more likely to implement the training they received on their jobs and transforming the skills to reality in workplaces.

==== Factors affecting training implementation behaviours ====
- Perceived flexibility is the extent to which employees perceive their work environment as flexible, moderates the relationship between self-efficacy beliefs and training implementation behaviours.
- Performance feedback is the extent to which employees receive feedback on their performance, and moderates the relationship between instrumentality beliefs and training implementation behaviours.
- Supervisor support is the direct effect on training implementation behaviours.

==== Five practical implications to improve training programs in public sector organisations ====
1. Design training programs that enhance trainees' self-efficacy beliefs and instrumentality beliefs to improve training transfer.
1. Provide a flexible work environment that allows employees to apply the skills learned in their jobs.
1. Provide performance feedback to employees to reinforce the usefulness of the training activities.
1. Provides supervisor support to employees to encourage them to implement the learned skills in their jobs.
1. Evaluate the effectiveness of their training programs by measuring the extent to which the learned skills transfer to the job and lead to meaningful changes in work performance.

=== Retention ===
Employees can leave jobs for a variety of different reasons. Employers should listen to the needs of their employees and make them feel valued. Employers need to create a positive work culture and motivating practices into their organization to keep employees.

Retention methods may have positive impact on the organization's turnover rate. They provide benefits that can include training, positive culture, growth opportunities within the organization, trust and confidence in leaders, and lower stress from overworking.

== Staffing agencies ==
Staffing agencies are becoming more common because of their ease of use and low cost. Companies save a lot of money through using a staffing agency because they do not have to spend extra money on employee recruitment or fund any of the screenings new hires must undergo. Using a staffing agency eliminates the need for companies to do extensive advertisements about the positions they are hiring for. The agencies save time by avoiding having to spend a large amount of time searching for applicants and recruiting new people. Staffing agencies provide a large network of job candidates, so it is easy to find people to fill the jobs. They have many tools and the knowledge to find the perfect applicants for the jobs each company needs to fill. If a company has an unexpected need to fill a position, a staffing agency can usually quickly find someone.

== Staffing technologies ==
Staffing technology is a broad term that encompasses the systems, processes, and software used by modern-day recruiting teams. It includes databases, applicant tracking systems (ATS), and complex web-based job boards. Staffing technology has come a long way from fax machines and telephones. In the last decade, modern-day technology, including live and asynchronous online video interviewing, artificial intelligence, chatbots, and social media, has influenced the staffing field. It has evolved significantly over the past decade, and today, it is no longer a matter of either/or when it comes to sourcing strategies. Staffing technologies can be used in unison to generate even better results in many cases. For instance, sourcing algorithms can identify candidates who are likely to fit a job well. Technology is being utilized to speed up the hiring process, reduce hiring costs, enhance the candidate experience during the hiring processes, facilitate candidate assessment and selection. Staffing technology can also be used to socialize new hires, track employees' skills and promotion readiness, along with retention enhancement and the creation of better relationships with high-potential future applicants (. Staffing technologies have made the job search process more efficient for companies and transparent for job seekers and employers alike.

=== Applicant Tracking System (ATS) ===
An applicant tracking system enables firms to gather data, classify prospects according to experience and skill level, and screen candidates. ATS is time efficient for organisations as the recruiters spend less time eliminating the less suitable individuals who have applied for certain roles due to the fact that many vacant positions can get hundreds or even more applicants that are unqualified. It screens and sort through CV’s using cutting-edge technologies like artificial intelligence and natural language processing matching an analyzing data using other algorithms.

Benefits of using ATS in staffing processes include:

- Improve quality of hire: Only the top applicants in the applicant pool are selected due to the initial automatic matching of candidates that recruiters will interact with.
- Speed up recruitment cycle: Recruiters can plan and carry out a more effective workflow using ATS.
- Reduce administrative tasks: Less paper-based work.
- Provide better and faster CV screening: Some vacancies receive an average of 250 applications, making it burdensome for recruiters to screen every incoming application. With ATS, the process is significantly shortened.

=== Candidate Recruitment Management (CRM) ===
CRM helps companies find the best candidates for each role and fill positions by automating communications, creating an organized and accessible candidate database. The database includes real-time insights and offers multiple views to showcase data in various ways. The most powerful CRM software includes several beneficial features that simplify the development of candidates' profiles and talent pools, reduce time-to-hire, and increase recruitment team productivity.

CRM promotes engagement and enhances candidates' experience by streamlining candidate communication and maintaining and enhancing relationships through automated email marketing, recruiting features, a job suggestion portal, and other means. Some of the features of CRM include:

- Automations: Saving time and eliminating the repetition of work, directing recruiters' focus on the next stage of staffing.
- Integrations: Storing all tools within CRM, creating custom automation recipes without developers. Manage the entire pipeline without needing to switch tabs.
- Views: Visualize data and the recruitment tools within minutes. For example, use the timeline view to see how long it takes candidates to go through the hiring process.
- Dashboards: View all important information in one place with custom boards, increasing visibility into hiring rate, job openings, salary expectations, and team performance. This feature of CRM helps run reports from a high-level view of the recruitment funnel down to the tiny details.

Benefits of using CRM in staffing processes include:

- Assist in finding candidates: By distributing jobs with a single click to numerous free and paid employment platforms, CRM is very effective and efficient for large organizations, such as public organizations.
- Attracting Candidates: By utilizing social media platforms and recruiting through social media forms, CRM improves employer branding and search engine optimization.
- Engage and Nurture candidates: The recruitment platform provides solutions for candidate relationship management, email recruiting campaigns, and talent networking.

Overall benefits of staffing technologies include:

- Faster hiring
- Gain a competitive advantage: Improving the hiring process minimizes the risk of losing top talent to other employers.
- Select the best candidates: Identification of the best and most qualified candidates quickly and accurately.
- Create a better hiring experience: The digital transformation of the staffing process is becoming more flexible, transparent, and practical.

== See also ==
- Human resources
