= Charlie Skelton =

British comedian

- Born: United Kingdom
- Education: University of Oxford
- Occupations: Writer, journalist, artist, actor
- Writing career
- Genres: Comedy, journalism

Charlie Skelton is a comedy writer, journalist, artist and actor from Suffolk, England. Since 2026, he has been the inaugural head writer of Weekend Update on Saturday Night Live UK.

== Early work ==
A University of Oxford graduate, he started out as a journalist, writing features for the Evening Standard and The Guardian.

== Writing ==
Skelton has written for several television programmes, including Have I Got News For You, 8 Out of 10 Cats, 10 O'Clock Live and The Big Fat Quiz of the Year. He has also written for A League of Their Own, The Eleven O'Clock Show, and FAQ U, and he was one of the writers on the MTV Europe Music Awards 2004.

In 2009, he began to report on the Bilderberg Group for The Guardian (series title: Our Man at Bilderberg), with his first article entitled "Our man at Bilderberg: in pursuit of the world's most powerful cabal". He has covered all the subsequent Bilderberg Group conferences: the 2010 conference in Sitges, Spain; the 2011 conference in St Moritz, Switzerland; the 2012 conference in Chantilly, Virginia, US; the 2013 conference which was held at The Grove, Watford; and the 2014 conference in Copenhagen, Denmark.

Skelton was the script editor on Charlie Brooker's comedy panel show You Have Been Watching and on Brooker's BBC Radio 4 show So Wrong It's Right. He was the co-founder, with Paul Carr, of The Friday Thing, a weekly email bulletin they started in 2001, and, in 2004, of the short-lived weekly all-comment newspaper The London News Review, with cartoons provided by Matt Groening. In 2005 he founded The Clacton Festival.

Skelton and fellow writer Victoria Coren used to hold a job reviewing porn films for the Erotic Review. They soon decided that most of the porn they had to watch was terrible and believed they could do better themselves, so the two of them set about making their own porn film, The Naughty Twins. They wrote about the process of doing so, and of the many lessons they learned (mostly good), in their book Once More, with Feeling: How We Tried to Make the Greatest Porn Film Ever (2003).

Skelton and Coren also appeared as judges on the final episode of the reality TV show Double Entry. In 2006, Skelton appeared on the BBC One reality gameshow Just the Two of Us.

== Art ==
In early 2000, Skelton put on a joint show with Hannah Borno at the Colville Place Gallery in Fitzrovia.

Skelton's first solo show, "Art is Easy", was held in 2001 at the Colville Place Gallery.

On 19–21 March 2003, he held a performance art exhibition, "The Impossibility of Death in the Mind of Someone from Suffolk", at the Institute of Contemporary Arts in London.

== Acting ==
=== Space Cadets ===
In 2005, Skelton was one of three actors posing as contestants in the Channel 4 spoof reality TV show Space Cadets. After weeks of training, Skelton and three genuine contestants were selected to go on a fake space mission. Afterwards Skelton wrote an essay about his part in the deception for The Guardian, part of which runs:

So, that was the oddest three-and-a-half weeks of my life. My poor brain is a scramble of half-truths, astronomical lies and unbridled lunacy. I've just scribbled a list of what I know for sure: I've been a mole on a fake reality show called Space Cadets; I have a Russian doll in my hand luggage; I've just spent the past five days in a flight simulator in a hangar on the Suffolk coast; and – last but by no means least – I've just spent the past five days in space. My default brain position aboard Earth Orbiter One was that we were 200 kilometres up, travelling at about seven kilometres per second. Too many things were telling me that for me to think otherwise. The simulator was too damned convincing. The Earth looked too serenely real whenever the pilots ushered us forward to the cockpit to view it. "This is truly humbling," I muttered, humbly, the first time I saw the planet spinning below us. I shuffled humbly back into the mid-deck and wrote a poem...

Referring to their book Once More, With Feeling, Victoria Coren said, "Shooting a highbrow erotic movie in a room full of naked Dutch people is good practice for keeping a straight face in Space Cadets. I know it isn't the most honourable job, but I'm very proud of him."
