= Beverley Hunt =

British medic

Beverley Hunt OBE FRCP FRCPath
- Born: Beverley Jane Hunt
- Education: University of Liverpool
- Occupations: Physician, academic
- Known for: Research on venous thromboembolism and thrombosis prevention
- Awards: Officer of the Order of the British Empire (2019)
- Medical career
- Field: Haematology; thrombosis; haemostasis
- Institutions: King's College London; Guy's and St Thomas' NHS Foundation Trust

Beverley Jane Hunt OBE FRCP FRCPath is a British haematologist. She is an honorary professor of thrombosis and haemostasis at King's College London and a consultant in thrombosis and haemostasis at Guy's and St Thomas' NHS Foundation Trust. Her research concerns thrombosis, haemostasis, venous thromboembolism (VTE), antiphospholipid syndrome, and obstetric haematology. She co-founded Thrombosis UK and serves as co-chair of its board of trustees.

== Education ==
Hunt was educated at Walthamstow Hall. She studied medicine at the University of Liverpool, graduating with an MB ChB degree in 1979. She later completed a MD degree at the University of Liverpool in 1997; her thesis concerned haemostasis and accelerated coronary artery disease in cardiac transplant recipients.

She became a Fellow of the Royal College of Physicians in 1996 and a Fellow of the Royal College of Pathologists in 1997.

== Career ==
Hunt became a consultant in the departments of haematology and pathology at Guy's and St Thomas' NHS Foundation Trust in 1991. She has directed its Thrombosis and Haemostasis Research Laboratory and has chaired the trust's Thrombosis and thromboprophylaxis Committee since 2008.

In 2008, Hunt was appointed Professor of Thrombosis and Haemostasis at King's College London. In 2023, she was appointed visiting professor of haematology at Nara University in Japan.

=== Thrombosis UK ===
In 2002, Hunt co-founded the charity that became Thrombosis UK. The organisation promotes awareness, prevention, and treatment of thrombosis and provides information and support to people affected by VTE and their families. Hunt served as its medical director before becoming co-chair of its board of trustees.

== Specialist interest and research ==
Hunt's research focuses on the prevention, diagnosis, and treatment of thrombosis and acquired bleeding disorders. Her work on venous thromboembolism (VTE) has included hospital-associated thrombosis, risk assessment, and the use of thromboprophylaxis in medical and surgical patients.

A substantial part of her research concerns thrombosis during pregnancy and the postpartum period. She has studied VTE risk assessment and prevention in pregnancy, anticoagulant use, and pregnancy complications associated with antiphospholipid syndrome and inherited thrombophilia. Her work has also addressed the management of antithrombin deficiency and other disorders of physiological anticoagulants.

Hunt has conducted research on haemostatic disorders in critical care, surgery, trauma, and extracorporeal circulation. This has included work on major haemorrhage, cardiopulmonary bypass, extracorporeal membrane oxygenation, fibrinolysis, coagulation testing, and anticoagulant and procoagulant therapies.

During the COVID-19 pandemic, Hunt contributed to research on COVID-19-associated coagulopathy, anticoagulation, and thrombotic complications in hospitalised patients. She was a member of the UK Expert Haematology Panel that described vaccine-induced immune thrombotic thrombocytopenia and developed clinical guidance for the condition.

In 2025, Hunt became a co-chair of the VTE working group for Element 1 of NHS England's Maternal Care Bundle. Published in January 2026, the element included an early-pregnancy VTE risk-assessment tool for use by patients and healthcare professionals.

Her other publications have addressed cancer-associated thrombosis, cerebrovascular disease in antiphospholipid syndrome, cardiovascular risk in haemophilia, kidney transplantation, and strategies for preventing post-thrombotic syndrome.

== Contribution to national and international guidelines ==
Hunt has contributed to guidelines and consensus reports on primary immune thrombocytopenia, heritable thrombophilia, thrombocytosis, and the management of major bleeding following trauma.

She served on National Institute for Health and Care Excellence groups that developed guidance on the prevention and management of VTE and a quality standard for VTE prevention. During the COVID-19 pandemic, she was a member of NICE's expert advisory panel for its managing COVID-19 rapid guideline. From 2022, she co-chaired the World Health Organization group responsible for its living COVID-19 management guideline.

Within the International Society on Thrombosis and Haemostasis (ISTH), Hunt chaired the local organising committee for the society's 2022 congress in London and later co-chaired its Scientific and Standardization Committee Subcommittee on Physiological Anticoagulants and Thrombophilia.

== Society memberships ==
Hunt co-founded the Obstetric Haematology Group of the British Society for Haematology in 2004 and co-chaired it for 15 years. She was also a founding member of the society's Education Committee.

She also serves on the board of the Pulmonary Embolism Response Team Consortium.

Hunt was a founding member of the World Thrombosis Day steering committee in 2014 and served as its chair from 2019 to 2022.

She was elected to the ISTH Council in 2026.

== Other interests ==
=== Sport ===
Hunt has competed as an age-group triathlete. She placed third in the women's 55–59 sprint event at the 2010 European Triathlon Championships in Athlone, Ireland.

=== Writing & theatre ===
Hunt wrote a play that won a prize in a European playwriting competition. It later received a rehearsed reading featuring actors Greg Wise and Janie Dee.

During the COVID-19 pandemic, Hunt described the effects of severe COVID-19 as "almost medieval", a phrase quoted in David Hare's 2020 monologue Beat the Devil. The monologue was performed by Ralph Fiennes in a production directed by Nicholas Hytner at the Bridge Theatre and was later screened on Sky Arts.

== Honours and awards ==
- 2009 – Diagnostic/Laboratory category, NHS London Innovation Awards, for work on detecting antiphospholipid antibodies
- 2011 – Research Paper of the Year, BMJ Awards, with the CRASH-2 trial team
- 2019 – Officer of the Order of the British Empire (OBE), for services to medicine
- 2020 – Medal for Service to Haematology, British Society for Haematology
- 2021 – Esteemed Career Award, International Society on Thrombosis and Haemostasis
- 2022 – Royal College of Pathologists Achievement Award, as a member of the UK Expert Haematology Panel on VITT
- 2025 – Jaap de Graeff Lecture, Leiden University
- 2026 – Lifetime Achievement Award, British Society for Haematology
- 2026 – Dr. Kenneth Rosenfield Founder’s Award and Keynote Lectureship Fund recipient, Pulmonary Embolism Response Team Consortium.

== Books ==
- Hunt, B. J.; Halliday, A.; Poston, L.; Schachter, M., eds. (1998). An Introduction to Vascular Biology: From Physiology to Pathophysiology. Cambridge University Press. ISBN 0-521-62330-8.
- Hunt, B. J.; Poston, L.; Schachter, M., eds. (2002). An Introduction to Vascular Biology: From Basic Science to Clinical Practice (2nd ed.). Cambridge University Press. ISBN 0-521-79652-0.
- Pavord, S.; Hunt, B. J., eds. (2010). The Obstetric Hematology Manual. Cambridge University Press. ISBN 978-0-521-86564-7.
- Pavord, S.; Hunt, B. J., eds. (2018). The Obstetric Hematology Manual (2nd ed.). Cambridge University Press. ISBN 978-1-107-12560-5.
