= Victoria Coren Mitchell =

English presenter and poker player (born 1972)

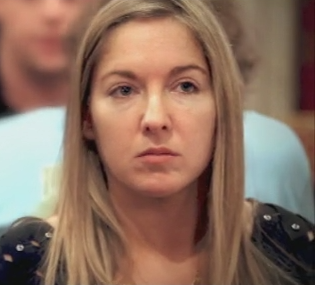
- Coren Mitchell in 2011
- Born: Victoria Elizabeth Coren; 18 August 1972 (age 54); Hammersmith, West London, England
- Education: St John's College, Oxford (BA)
- Occupations: Journalist; television presenter; poker player; writer
- Years active: 1992–present
- Known for: Only Connect (2008–present)
- Spouse: David Mitchell (m. 2012)
- Children: 2
- Father: Alan Coren
- Relatives: Giles Coren (brother); Michael Coren (first cousin once removed)

World Series of Poker
- Bracelet: None
- Money finishes: 2
- Highest WSOP Main Event finish: None

European Poker Tour
- Titles: 2
- Final tables: 2
- Money finishes: 6
- Victoria Coren Mitchell's voice Recorded in April 2011 from the BBC Radio 4 programme Saturday Live
- Website: victoriacoren.com

Victoria Elizabeth Coren Mitchell (née Coren; born 18 August 1972) is a British writer, TV presenter and professional poker player. She writes weekly columns for The Daily Telegraph and has hosted the BBC television quiz show Only Connect since its launch in 2008.

== Early life ==
Victoria Elizabeth Coren was born on 18 August 1972 in Hammersmith, West London, the only daughter of the humorist and journalist Alan Coren and Anne (née Kasriel). Her parents had been brought up in Orthodox Jewish households but did not consider themselves religious. She grew up in Cricklewood, North West London, with her elder brother, journalist Giles Coren. She is related to Canadian journalist Michael Coren.

Coren attended independent girls' schools between the ages of 5 and 18, including St Paul's Girls' School, and then read English at St John's College, Oxford. She recalls not fitting in to the culture at St Paul's, stating, "My parents sent me to a very posh school in West London. I was not like the girls there. They were elegant, goyishe west Londoners – they knew things I didn’t".

== Writing ==
At the age of 14, Coren had a short story published under a pseudonym in Just Seventeen magazine. She won a competition in The Daily Telegraph to write a column about teenage life for its "Weekend" section, which she continued writing during her own teenage years. During a Channel 4 broadcast, she explained that one Telegraph reader had written to her, criticising her column and had used a very great number of swear words, all in Latin.

Her books include Love 16 and Once More, with Feeling, about her attempt (with co-author Charlie Skelton) to make "the greatest porn film ever". Their jobs reviewing porn films for the Erotic Review led them to believe that most of what they were watching was terrible and that they could make better films themselves.

She adapted the newspaper columns of John Diamond into a play called A Lump in my Throat, which was performed during the 2000 Edinburgh Festival at the Assembly Rooms, the Grace Theatre and the New End Theatre in London, before she adapted it again for a BBC Two docudrama with Neil Pearson, broadcast in 2001.

Victoria and Giles Coren wrote an introduction to Chocolate and Cuckoo Clocks, an anthology of the best comic writing by their father Alan, published by Canongate in October 2008.

Her poker memoir For Richer, For Poorer: A Love Affair with Poker (the subtitle changed to Confessions of a Player when released in paperback in 2011) was published in September 2009, and was well reviewed in The Times and The Observer.

She writes questions for Only Connect under the pseudonym "Geri Wiley", a nod to Ronnie Barker's "Gerald Wiley".

== Ormerod hoax ==
In 2007, following the death of her father, having put a notice in The Times inviting those who knew him to attend a service, she was warned by a friend that a "gang of serial funeral crashers" based in the south of England were checking death notices to find funerals and memorial services to crash for their own enjoyment. After receiving some suspicious email replies to her notice, she instigated a hoax to trap the group. She created "Sir William Ormerod" and placed a death notice. A week later, she placed another notice in The Times "in the guise of his grieving boyfriend Peter" for his memorial service "followed by a drinks reception". She reported that the group duly claimed to have known Ormerod and applied for tickets.

After first suggesting holding the memorial service and putting laxative in the canapés, she arranged for a friend to telephone the ringleader (a serial fraudster and ex-magistrate) to let it be known that she knew who they were and that he was not welcome; however, she let the others in the gang come to her father's service, "gave them a drink and sent them on their way". She has written articles in the Observer and The Guardian about her experience.

== Poker ==
Coren Mitchell was the first woman to win an event on the European Poker Tour, the first player to win both a televised professional tournament (EPT London 2006) and a televised celebrity tournament (Celebrity Poker Club 2005), and the first player to win two European Poker Tour Main Events (EPT London 2006 and EPT Sanremo 2014). She frequently plays Texas hold 'em at the Victoria Casino in London's Edgware Road. As a commentator/presenter she has presented William Hill Poker Grand Prix 2 (Sky Sports) and Late Night Poker and The Poker Nations Cup for Channel 4, and World Poker Tour for ITV2; and has commentated on The Monte Carlo EPT, Grosvenor UK Poker Tour (Channel 4), Ultimate Poker Challenge (Channel 5).

During her poker career, she has become a close friend of The Hendon Mob and mixes weekly home games with frequent visits to two regular casinos. She appeared in five episodes of Late Night Poker, although she never made it to a series grand final. However, in Late Night Poker's spin-off Celebrity Poker Club, she defeated Willie Thorne to win the series two grand final before joining Jesse May as the commentator in series three. In the 2003 Hold-Em 100 tournament in London, she was a guest dealer for the final table.

On 24 September 2006, she won the main event of the European Poker Tour London, earning a prize of £500,000 and defeating Australian professional Emad Tahtouh. On 20 November 2011 she finished second in the International Federation of Poker's inaugural The Table World Championship, eventually losing heads-up with 29-year-old Spaniard Raul Mestre. She received $100,000 for second place, $10,000 of which she donated to Age UK. In April 2014 she won the main event of the European Poker Tour San Remo, earning €476,100 and becoming the first player to have won two EPT titles. As of 2021, her total live tournament winnings exceed $2,500,000, making her the 14th best-earning female live poker player ever.

She had been a member of Team PokerStars Pro, but in November 2014, she removed her endorsement a few hours after PokerStars had announced they were starting an online casino. She said she was uncomfortable about potential addiction by vulnerable people to a site where the odds are in favour of the operator, and did not want to be associated with such an operation.

She has said that she regularly stays up until 6 am, "smoking and drinking and gambling. But I like cooking and gardening too, which makes me sound like a very strange mix of an old lady and teenage boy." When asked about this in 2012, she stated: "It is still true. I'll grow up one day, but not quite yet."

Coren Mitchell was inducted into the Women in Poker Hall of Fame in 2016.

== Personal life ==
On 20 March 2012, Coren announced her engagement to actor and comedian David Mitchell. According to David, they first met at a film premiere in 2007, and had a short-lived series of dates, but only began dating properly three years later. The couple married in November 2012, in North London, and their daughter was born in May 2015. In November 2023, Coren announced on Twitter that she had given birth to her second child in late October.

In April 2012, she reported that she was terrified of flying. In September 2000, she stated she had forever given up on flying the day the therapist she had been seeing to get over her fear of flying died in a plane crash.

== Television and radio credits ==
Year	Show	Role	Notes
	Off the Page: Radio 4	Presenter	
	Fourth Column: Radio 4	Presenter	
1992	100%	Performer	
2001	I Love the 80s	Guest	
2003	Double Entry	Judge	
2004	The Pedants' Revolt	Guest	
2006–2007	Balderdash and Piffle	Presenter	
2007	Charlie Brooker's Screenwipe	Guest	
2008–present	Only Connect	Host	
2008–present	Heresy	Host	
2009–2010	You Have Been Watching	Guest	
2009–2010	The Wright Stuff	Guest panelist	
2010	The Bubble	Guest panelist	
2010	My Teenage Diary: Radio 4	Guest	
2010–2015	Question Time	Guest panelist	
2010–2014	Have I Got News for You	Guest panelist	
2014–present	Have I Got News for You	Guest host	
2011	Frank Skinner's Opinionated	Guest	
2011–2013	8 Out of 10 Cats	Guest	Comic Relief Special (2011); Season 15, Episode 7
2011–2023	Would I Lie to You?	Guest	
2012	Room 101	Guest	
2012–present	QI	Guest	
2013	Goodbye Television Centre	Presenter	
2013	The Secret Life of Mary Poppins: A Culture Show Special	Presenter	
2015	The Unbelievable Truth	Guest	
2015	How To Be Bohemian With Victoria Coren Mitchell (3 episodes): BBC Four	Presenter	
2016	The Great Sport Relief Bake Off	Celebrity contestant	
2016	Chain Reaction: Radio 4	Interviewer/Guest	
2016–present	Women Talking About Cars: Radio 4	Host	
2018	Jon Richardson: Ultimate Worrier	Guest panelist	
2018	The Big Narstie Show	Guest	Season 1, Episode 3
2019–2021	Hypothetical	Guest panelist	
2019	The One Show	Guest	
2020	Celebrity Gogglebox for Su2c	Guest	
2021	Taskmaster	Contestant	Series 12
