= Erotic Review =

Monthly UK-based lifestyle publication

- Frequency: Twice a year
- First issue: 1995; 31 years ago
- Company: Erotic Review Publishing Ltd.
- Country: United Kingdom
- Language: English
- Website: ER website

Erotic Review is a UK-based magazine published twice a year. It publishes essays, short stories, poetry, art and reviews, taking a literary approach to desire. Erotic Review is edited by Lucy Roeber, deputy edited by Saskia Vogel, and designed by Studio Frith.

Over the years, Erotic Review has had many prominent contributors, among them Sarah Waters, Michel Faber, Barry Humphries, Simon Raven, Auberon Waugh, Alain de Botton, India Knight, Arnold Wesker, Mariella Frostrup, Claus von Bülow, Damien Hirst, Boris Johnson, Malcolm McLaren, Steven Appleby, David Bailey, George Saunders and Immodesty Blaize.

Subsequent Booker Prize-winner DBC Pierre published his first short story in Erotic Review.

Meanwhile, Victoria Coren and Charlie Skelton wrote their book Once More, with Feeling: How We Tried to Make the Greatest Porn Film Ever after their time reviewing porn films for Erotic Review inspired them to try to make their own.

== History ==
Erotic Review was founded in 1995 as a monthly newsletter for the publisher Erotic Print Society (subsequently Erotic Review Books). It was created by first editor Jamie Maclean, who ceded control to Rowan Pelling in 1997. Pelling staged a management buyout from the Erotic Print Society in 2001, after a successful tenure that saw circulation figures rise to 30,000. As the magazine's parent company had been experiencing financial difficulties, Pelling was able to purchase Erotic Review for only £1 plus liabilities. In mid-2003 Pelling sold Erotic Review to media mogul Felix Dennis, whose company Dennis Publishing controlled titles including Maxim. In late 2004 Erotic Review was sold again, this time to a top-shelf magazine publisher. When the new management attempted to transfer the editorial team to the Penthouse offices in Surrey, they resigned en masse, and Pelling was replaced as editor by Penthouse UK's sub editor Catasha Kin.

Edward Timon, who had been hired as deputy editor under Kin, took over as Editor-in-Chief at the end of 2004 as part of a deal to revive another well-known British publication, Forum - The International Journal of Human Relations; successfully negotiating a deal with publisher Q3 to take on monthly magazine Forum only if Erotic Review could also be revived as a quarterly publication. Timon revamped ER to be less elitist, aimed at the emerging neo-libertarian audiences who were feeding the Burlesque cabaret revival in the UK at the time. He reduced the size of the publication to A5 (a format he termed as 'hand bag sized') and significantly increased the page count. He laid out the blueprint for a fully online offering of freely available content, with some also available for purchase. Utilising the global nature of the internet, printing was moved from Spain to Hong Kong allowing for significant savings to be achieved, despite the need to have the magazine flown to Dubai and then shipped to Felixstowe.

The relaunch edition, Edition 69, featured burlesque performer Miss Lily White on the cover and a book review by famous comedian and raconteur Barry Humphries. Timon emphasised not only the need for a younger fresher audience without having to 'dumb down' but also vigorously supported sexual freedom campaigners such as Tuppy Owens and the Erotic Awards arguing that with the privilege of titillation came the responsibility to educate and to defend all people's right to feel erotic and engage in their sexuality, regardless of class, income, or physical ability. Timon's campaign for new editorial assistance received attention from the Financial Times' Clay Harris, in the Mudlark media column for seeking staff who "must embody pure sunshine" Over the next two years the ER readership steadily grew, while Forum's stagnated, until the then publisher of Attitude magazine, Trojan, purchased the titles and took on the entire staff of Q3. He requested to be released from his obligations under Forum magazine to concentrate on Erotic Review.

Timon was supplanted by the newly reinstated assistant editor of Forum Jan Birks, previously of Northern & Shell, in late 2006. Birks, in her own style, tried to make the magazine more mainstream, "not just for the toffee-nosed or the literary". The change of tack did not work, and after two issues Erotic Review was sold back to its original owners The Erotic Print Society in early 2007. The magazine was merged with The Erotic Print Society's new magazine SEx, and re-launched, with Founder Jamie Maclean as editor and Edward Timon as associate editor, in December 2007 in a larger format. A second relaunch took place in 2009, when Erotic Review was purchased by one of its longest serving contributors, writer and broadcaster Kate Copstick. Literary Agent, Lisa Moylett of Coombs Moylett Literary Agency bought the Erotic Review in 2014 and during this period collaborated with Mariella Frostrup to publish Desire: 100 of Literature's Sexiest Stories. Lisa Moylett sold the magazine to Jamie Maclean, its original founder, in 2017.
