= Rowan Pelling =

British journalist

- Born: 17 January 1968 (age 58); Toys Hill, Kent, England
- Education: Walthamstow Hall
- Alma mater: St Hugh's College, Oxford
- Occupations: Journalist, broadcaster, editor
- Years active: 1990s–present

Rowan Dorothy Pelling (born 17 January 1968) is a British journalist, who first achieved note as the editor of a monthly literary/erotic magazine, the Erotic Review.

== Education ==
Pelling was educated at Walthamstow Hall, a day independent school for girls in the centre of the commuter town of Sevenoaks in Kent in Southeast England, followed by St Hugh's College at the University of Oxford, from which she graduated in 1991 with a degree in English Literature.

== Life and career ==
After graduating, Pelling worked at the satirical magazine Private Eye. She briefly carried out research for Shirley Porter’s legal team during the Homes for Votes scandal, talking to Andrew Hosken when he was carrying out his investigation into Porter. She went on to work for GQ magazine, where she met her future husband Angus Mackinnon. In 1997 she transformed Jamie Maclean's Erotic Print Society's slim foolscap newsletter into the Erotic Review, a magazine whose circulation peaked at over 30,000. She sold the magazine in 2004.

Pelling has contributed to a variety of newspapers and magazines, including regular columns for the Independent on Sunday, Daily Mail, The Mail on Sunday, the Daily Telegraph, GQ, and Jack. She was a judge of the 2004 Man Booker Prize and is a regular columnist for the Daily Telegraph. She is the mother of two sons and lives in Cambridge.

In 2017 Pelling launched a new magazine, The Amorist, branded as "for devotees of love & passion". It switched from print to online-only after seven months.
