= Thrombosis UK =

Research and awareness charity

- Founded: 2002
- Founder: Beverley Hunt, Alan Moody
- Registration no.: 1090540
- Purpose: Prevention of venous thromboembolism
- Region served: United Kingdom
- Services: Charitable services
- Website: thrombosisuk.org

Thrombosis UK (previously known as 'Lifeblood, the Thrombosis Charity') is a UK based charity whose stated mission is to increase awareness of thrombosis among the public and health professionals, and to raise research funds to improve patient care through improved prevention and treatment of venous thromboembolic disease.

The charity is governed by nine trustees and is supported by a multi-disciplinary group. Along with efforts to support research in thrombosis and to raise awareness through an annual "National Thrombosis Week", they campaign for governments in the UK to prioritise venous thromboembolism (VTE) prevention in the National Health Service ('Stop the Clots'). They also strive to improve the clinical diagnosis of venous thromboembolism in the community ('Spot the Clots').

== History ==
Thrombosis UK was founded in 2002 by Professor Beverley Hunt, Consultant Haematologist at Guy's and St Thomas' NHS Foundation Trust and Professor Alan Moody, professor of radiology at the University of Nottingham to address two important issues: improving medical and general knowledge of thrombosis, and raising funds for research into thrombosis.

In 2003, the charity started campaigning to raise awareness. They founded the yearly National Thrombosis Week and provided evidence on several health select committees. They also won the title of 'Health Charity of the Year' in 2010. In the same year, Lifeblood published the results of a conducted survey which showed that there is a big education gap concerning hospital acquired blood clots.

In 2010, on behalf of Lifeblood, Professor Hunt was included as a member of the guideline development group for the National Institute for Health and Clinical Excellence (NICE) guidelines in which mandatory thrombosis risk assessment of all patients on admission was set as a must for all National Health Service (NHS) hospitals. In 2011, Lifeblood continued political campaigning with the All Parliamentary Thrombosis Group and health professionals which led to the CQUIN VTE targets which mandate VTE risk assessment.

== Campaigns ==
=== Stop the Clots ===
The 'Stop the Clots' campaign aims to ensure that every adult patient admitted to hospital across the UK receives a venous thromboembolism risk assessment and appropriate prophylaxis in line with national clinical guidelines (SIGN Clinical Guideline in Scotland, and NICE Clinical Guideline 92 in England, Wales and Northern Ireland). The House of Commons welcomed the parliamentary launch of Lifeblood: The Thrombosis Charity and commended its campaign to Stop the Clots in 2003.

=== Spot the Clots ===
The 'Spot the Clots' campaign is aimed at the community, hoping to improve education of health professionals and raise awareness of the general public about blood clots.

=== National Thrombosis Week ===
National Thrombosis Week is an annual awareness-raising campaign run by Lifeblood every spring. Campaigns were lauded by Parliament in 2006 and 2008.

== Parliamentary testimony ==
Lifeblood provided both written and oral evidence on several Health Committees:

- In December 2004 Lifeblood gave oral evidence before the House of Commons Health Committee about the importance of prevention of venous thromboembolism and the importance of the use of thromboprophylaxis.
- In February 2005 Lifeblood gave written evidence at the House of Commons Health Select Committee's Second report on venous thromboembolism.
- In March 2007 Lifeblood provided written evidence as a response to the House of Commons Health Select Committee's Inquiry into NICE.
- In October 2007 Professor Beverley Hunt represented Lifeblood in the House of Commons and gave oral evidence during the Fifth Evidence Session in inquiry into NICE.
- In October 2008 Lifeblood provided written evidence for the House of Commons Health Select Committee's Inquiry into Patient Safety.
- In November 2010 Lifeblood gave written evidence for the House of Commons Health Select Committee's Inquiry into the revalidation of doctors.
- In May 2012 Lifeblood provided a submission to the National Assembly for Wales Health and Social Committee inquiry into venous thromboembolism prevention in Wales.

== Recognition ==
In November 2007 the House of Commons congratulated Lifeblood in an early day motion for its work during the previous five years. Lifeblood was also the winner of the Charity Awards 2010 in the category for Healthcare and Medical Research.
