= Candidate submittal =

Alternative recruitment process

Candidate Submittal is an alternative recruitment process offered by companies whereby the candidate submittal agency provides coaching for the job seeker with respect to their job application.

== Background ==
The job seeker usually sources their own prospective job opportunity, before applying for it through the candidate submittal agency, which is usually run by ex-recruitment professionals or other industry veterans. The candidate submittal service will often vet, edit, or enhance the job seekers application before passing it on to the employer. The service will then act on behalf of the job seeker in the negotiations and would also may help prepare the job seeker for an interview process or other pre-interview engagement. They would also provide any relevant feedback to the job seeker with regards to their application.

If the job seeker is hired, the candidate submittal agency may refund a portion of the sign-on fee back to the job seeker, usually in recognition of the fact that the candidate has completed some of the recruitment process themselves by sourcing their own jobs.

== The Market ==
Companies will generally employ a number of different methods to fill their recruitment needs including employee referral, company websites, recruitment agencies, and job boards. Generally, it is found that around 27.1% of recruitment is done through employee referral - making it the largest source of company recruitment, with standard recruitment making up around 5.2% of overall recruitment.

The future of the recruitment industry is generally considered by industry analysts to be in 'Career Networks', that can provide employee's with the backup necessary to optimize their job searching process - including having access to a 'career coach', utilizing niche recruitment channels, building a profile and receiving positive feedback.

== Candidate Submittal vs Agency Recruitment ==
Candidate Submittal came about because the standard recruitment model was perceived by some in the recruitment industry as being wasteful and providing poor value to both employers and job seekers.

It was argued by these individuals that the standard recruitment model was never meant to be an extension of a company HR department, nor was it designed to accommodate the market share which it currently holds in the recruitment industry and to become the de facto standard for general mass-recruitment needs. They argued that the recruiter in a standard agency is cast both as a 'career coach' by the job seeker and as an 'industry specialist' by the employer. Whereas in fact the recruiter is ill-suited to fulfill either of these rules.

Candidate Submittal agencies aim to re-cast the role of a recruiter into more of a background setting. Using a candidate submittal service, the client will receive feedback and advice with regards to their application. They will not however be interviewed or matched to a position by the candidate submittal agency.

A candidate submittal service will usually offer a substantial discount over standard agency recruitment. Also, because it aims to compensate job seekers for the time they spend sourcing their own opportunities. It means that job seekers are less inclined to leave this job matching process to a recruiter who may or may not be suitably qualified to determine whether a certain candidate fits a certain position. Also since candidate submittal effectively removes the middle man in the recruitment process ( the recruiter ). It can serve to speed up the process in general and provide more meaningful feedback to the job seeker.

== Criticisms ==
While candidate submittal can help to cut down on recruitment costs for an employer and help to make the job hunting process more efficient, it does require the candidates to spend time sourcing their own employment opportunities, a job that would typically be left to the recruiter to complete.
