= Sourcing (personnel) =

Proactive recruitment technique

Sourcing is the hiring of new employees through the identification, assessment, and engagement of skilled worker candidates through proactive recruiting techniques. Professionals specializing in sourcing are known as sourcers or recruiters.

== Definition ==
Candidate sourcing activity typically ends once the name, job title, job function and contact information for the potential candidate is determined by the candidate sourcer. To further develop a list of names that were sourced some companies have a second person then reach out to the names on the list to initiate a dialogue with them with the intention of pre-screening the candidate against the job requirements and gauging the interest level in hearing about new job opportunities. This activity is called "candidate profiling" or "candidate pre-screening". The term candidate sourcing should not be confused with candidate research.

In some situations a person that "sources" candidates can and will perform both 'primary' and 'secondary' sourcing techniques to identify candidates as well as the candidate profiling to further pre-screen candidates but there is a growing market for experts solely focused on "telephone sourcing", "internet sourcing/researching" and candidate profiling. The actual act to source candidates can usually be split out into two clearly defined techniques: primary sourcing and secondary sourcing.

=== Phone ===
Phone sourcing requires uncovering candidate information by calling individuals directly and/or organizations to uncover data on people, their role, title and responsibilities, email address, company, etc.

The terms "phone sourcers", "phone name generator", or "telephone names sourcer" generally apply to primary sourcing techniques.

=== Secondary (internet) ===
In recruiting and sourcing,this means the use of techniques (primarily Internet research and utilizing advanced Boolean operators) to identify candidates. Individuals working in the recruiting industry often possess specialized expertise in identifying talent from less accessible areas of the internet, such as forums, blogs, alumni groups, conference attendee lists, personal home pages, and social networks.

The rapid growth of social networking platforms and the increasing volume of personal information shared online have resulted in a vast amount of available data. As a result, sourcers frequently rely on specialized applications to assist with data mining. There are tools available for nearly every major social platform that enable the extraction and screening of relevant information.

The term "internet sourcer", "Internet name generator" or "internet researcher" generally applies to the use of secondary sourcing techniques.

== Examples of techniques ==
Sourcing for candidates refers to proactively identifying people who are either a) not actively looking for job opportunities (passive candidates) or b) candidates who are actively searching for job opportunities (active candidates), though the industry also recognizes the existence of 'active candidate sourcing' using candidate databases, job boards and the like.

Though there has been much debate within the staffing community as to how to accurately define an "active candidate" versus a "passive candidate," typically either term is irrelevant to a candidate sourcer as the status of any particular candidate can change from moment to moment or with a simple phone call from a recruiter that happens to present a job opportunity. The status of being an "active" or "passive" candidate is fluid and changes depending on the circumstances, including the position being offered.

Activities related to sourcing in recruiting can also be categorized into "push activities" and "pull activities."

Push activities are activities undertaken to reach out to the target audience. This generally includes headhunting, email campaigns, and referral follow-ups.

Pull activities are activities that result in applicants coming to know of an opportunity on their own. Pull activities may include the following: advertising on a microsite with a registration process (this makes search engines index the ad), advertising (in newspapers, on cable TV, through flyers/leaflets, etc.), posting a job in job portals, etc.

In summary, a push activity is akin to a direct marketing activity, whereas pull activities are more indirect marketing of the same concept. Both ideally result in applicants becoming interested and the interest triggering a response (applying, referring, calling, sending an SMS, etc.). These action triggers are also sometimes referred to as Call To Action (CTA) steps.

=== Proactive techniques ===
1. Using Boolean operators on major search engine sites (Google, Bing.com, Yahoo!, etc.) to identify potential candidates who might meet the criteria of the position to be filled based on targeted keywords.
2. Searching for candidates in job board resume databases using keywords related to the position requirements.
3. Looking in own recruitment database.
4. Networking with individuals to uncover candidates. This includes the use of social networking tools and sites such as LinkedIn.
5. "Phone sourcing" or cold calling into companies that might contain individuals that match the key requirements of the position that needs to be filled.
6. Mobile recruiting by text allows employers to source candidates by engaging them on their mobile devices.

== Examples of what is not sourcing ==
=== Reactive techniques ===
1. Reviewing candidates who have applied to positions through the corporate/agency website
2. Corporate recruiter receiving candidates from employment agencies
3. Screening candidates at a career fair

== Specializations ==
=== Internet researching ===
Internet research is a highly specialized field that takes time to master. Many of the best sourcers started out as recruiters who found they enjoy the "thrill of the hunt" more than the rest of the process and became successful because of their heightened research skills and abilities. Another common origin for strong sourcers is from professions where research or investigative skills are an imperative (journalists, librarians, fact-checkers, academic researchers, etc.), which is a common skillset within the field of competitive intelligence.

Several recruiters can rely on the same sourcer to generate leads and fill their pipelines with pre-screened or pre-qualified candidates. Sourcers are often the initial point of contact with a candidate, qualifying whether they are a real job seeker or just a job shopper. As a result, sourcers are uniquely positioned to sell or "pre-close" candidates before the candidates enter the rest of the recruitment process.

=== Telephone sourcing ===
Phone sourcing is using the telephone to gain information about a topic or person. In personnel sourcing, the telephone is used to locate persons with specific titles or job functions inside specific organizations. It is considered "primary" research and as such is not to be confused with the practice of finding information elsewhere (on the Internet) and then using the telephone to "check" it for verification (is the person "still there"; has the person's title changed?). True phone sourcing is practiced by a minority in the personnel sourcing community and requires a mastery of verbal communication techniques.

Telephone sourcing brings forth the majority of the existing workforce that are not locatable on the Internet. "Not locatable" means that a potential candidate cannot be located (tracked) on the Internet because that potential candidate has not left a footprint large enough to include information that would link them to a specific (boolean) inquiry.

Some industries/professions are better represented than others on the Internet; Information Technology (IT) and Recruiting being some of the most well represented.

== See also ==
- Acqui-hiring
- Recruitment
- Labour hire
- Online vetting
- Employee referral
