= Recruitment =

Process of attracting and selecting candidates for a job

Military recruitment poster for the British Army

Recruitment is the overall process of identifying, sourcing, screening, shortlisting, interviewing, and hiring candidates for jobs (either permanent or temporary) within an organization. Recruitment also is the process involved in choosing people for unpaid roles. Managers, human resource generalists, and recruitment specialists may be tasked with carrying out recruitment, but in some cases, public-sector employment, commercial recruitment agencies, or specialist search consultancies such as executive search in the case of more senior roles, are used to undertake parts of the process. Internet-based recruitment is now widespread, including the use of artificial intelligence (AI).

== Process ==
The recruitment process varies widely based on the employer, seniority and type of role and the industry or sector the role is in. Some recruitment processes may include;

- Job analysis - For new jobs or substantially changed jobs. It might be undertaken to document the knowledge, skills, abilities, and other characteristics (KSAOs) required or sought for the job. From these, the relevant information is captured in a person's specification.
- Kick-Off or Scoping Call - This is when the recruiter will connect with the hiring manager to understand the needs for the role.
- Sourcing - Sorting through applicants and resumes to select candidates to screen.
- Screening and selection - Picking/choosing, interviewing, and hiring the right candidate.
- Job interview - Shortlisted candidates are invited for interviews. The interview process may include one or more rounds of interviews with HR representatives, hiring managers, and sometimes panel interviews.

== Sourcing ==
Sourcing is the use of one or more strategies to attract and identify candidates to fill job vacancies. It may involve internal and/or external recruitment advertising, using appropriate media such as job portals, local or national newspapers, social media, business media, specialist recruitment media, professional publications, window advertisements, yard signs, job centers, career fairs, or in a variety of ways via the internet.

Alternatively, employers may use recruitment consultancies or agencies to find otherwise scarce candidates—who, in many cases, may be content in their current positions and are not actively looking to move. This initial research for candidates—also called name generation—produces contact information for potential candidates, whom the recruiter can then discreetly contact and screen.

In recent years, recruitment practices have evolved to include more direct engagement between job seekers and hiring managers. Instead of applying only through automated applicant tracking systems, many professionals now use networking tools, career platforms, and industry databases to reach decision-makers more efficiently. This trend has led to a rise in specialized services that compile contact details of recruiters and hiring managers, helping candidates connect more personally during the application process.

To increase the number and quality of applicants the wage offered for the job can be increased, the application-wage elasticity was estimated at 1 by a study.

=== Referral recruitment programs ===
Referral recruitment programs allow both outsiders and employees to refer or recommend quality candidates (people they know or are connected to) for filling job openings. Online, they can be implemented by leveraging social media networks.

=== Employee referrals ===
An employee referral is a candidate recommended by an existing employee. This is sometimes referred to as referral recruitment. Encouraging existing employees to select and recruit suitable candidates results in:

- Improved candidate quality ('fit'). Employee referrals allow existing employees to screen, select and recommend candidates, lowering staff attrition rate; candidates hired through referrals tend to stay up to 3 times longer than candidates hired through job boards and other sources. The one-to-one direct relationship between the candidate and the referring employee and the exchange of knowledge that takes place allows the candidate to develop a strong understanding of the company, its business and the application and recruitment process. The candidate is thereby enabled to assess their own suitability and likelihood of success, including "fitting in".
- Reduces the considerable cost of third-party recruitment service providers who would have previously conducted the screening and selection process. An op-ed in Crain's in April 2013 recommended that companies look to employee referral to speed the recruitment process for purple squirrels, which are rare candidates considered to be "perfect" fits for open positions.
- The referring employee typically receives a referral bonus, either at the time of the referral (smaller amount) or at the time of placement (larger amount) and is widely acknowledged as being cost-effective. The Global Employee Referral Index 2013 Survey found that 92% of participants reported employee referrals as one of the top recruiting sources.
- As candidate quality improves and interview-to-job-offer conversion rates increase, the amount of time spent interviewing decreases, which means the company's employee headcount can be streamlined and be used more efficiently. Marketing and advertising expenditures decrease as existing employees source potential candidates from existing personal networks of friends, family, colleagues and professional associates. By contrast, recruiting through third-party recruitment agencies incurs a 20–25% agency finder's fee – which can top $25K for an employee with $100K annual salary.

There is, however, a risk of less corporate creativity: An overly homogeneous workforce is at risk for "fails to produce novel ideas or innovations." Additionally, sourcing exclusively from employee referrals may jeopardize the overall diversity of your workforce.

=== Diversity ===
Many major corporations recognize the need for diversity in hiring to compete successfully in a global economy. The challenge is to avoid recruiting staff who are "in the likeness of existing employees" but also to retain a more diverse workforce and work with inclusion strategies to include them in the organization.

=== Social network referral ===
Initially, responses to mass-emailing or organically posting open job announcements to those within employees' social network slowed the screening process.

Two ways in which this improved are:

- Making available screen tools for employees to use, although this interferes with the "work routines of already time-starved employees"
- "When employees put their reputation on the line for the person they are recommending"

== Screening and selection ==
Various tests can assess a variety of knowledge, skills, and abilities including literacy and physical ability. Standardized tests were found to result in selection validity while avoiding discrimination. Additional screening tools include academic degrees, credentials and background checks. A 2024 meta-analysis found academic performance correlated 21% with job performance with large heterogeneity and a higher correlation in case of job-relevant courses. Grade inflation can reduce the signal of grades for applicant achievement.

Employers may consider soft skills, such as interpersonal ability and leadership, when evaluating candidates. Some organizations also consider organizational culture and team fit as part of recruitment decisions.

The selection process is often claimed to be an invention of Thomas Edison. Recruiters and agencies may use applicant tracking systems to filter candidates, along with software tools for psychometric testing and performance-based assessment.

== Illegal practices ==
In many countries, employers are legally mandated to ensure their screening and selection processes meet equal opportunity and ethical standards. Employers are generally required to screen for legal immigration status to prevent illegal employment.

When hiring for positions that involve ethical and safety concerns it is often the individual employees who make decisions which can lead to devastating consequences to the whole company. Likewise, executive positions are often tasked with making difficult decisions when company emergencies occur such as public relation nightmares, natural disasters, pandemics, or a slowing economy. Businesses that have made headlines for undesirable cultures may also have a difficult time recruiting new hires. Companies should aim to minimize corruption using tools such as the recruitment processes, pre-employment screening, personality tests, induction, training, and establishing a code of conduct. Corruption during recruitment include kickbacks, bribes and nepotism.

In the United States, the Equal Employment Opportunity Commission has established guidelines for prohibited employment policies/practices. These regulations serve to prevent employment discrimination based on race, color, religion, sex, age, disability, etc. However, recruitment ethics is an area of business that is prone to many other unethical and corrupt practices. According to Independent Broad-based Anti-corruption Commission (IBAC), business ethics are a vital component to recruitment; hiring unqualified friends or family, allowing problematic employees to be recycled through a company, and failing to properly validate the background of candidates can be detrimental to a business.

In Germany, universities, though public employers, are generally not required to advertise most vacancies especially of academic positions (teaching and/or research) other than tenured full professors (verbeamtete Hochschullehrer). At the same time, anti-discrimination measures and equal opportunities (although required within the framework of the European Union) only apply to advertised jobs and to the wording of the job advert.

=== Candidates with disabilities ===
The word disability carries few positive connotations for most employers. Research has shown that the employer biases tend to improve through first-hand experience and exposure with proper supports for the employee and the employer making the hiring decisions. As for most companies, money and job stability are two of the contributing factors to the productivity of a disabled employee, which in return equates to the growth and success of a business. Hiring disabled workers produces more advantages than disadvantages. There is no difference in the daily production of a disabled worker. Given their situation, they are more likely to adapt to their environmental surroundings and acquaint themselves with equipment, enabling them to solve problems and overcome adversity than other employees. The United States Internal Revenue Service (IRS) grants companies Disabled Access Credit when they meet eligibility criteria.

=== Safer recruitment ===
"Safer recruitment" refers to procedures intended to promote and exercise "a safe culture including the supervision and oversight of those who work with children and vulnerable adults". The NSPCC describes safer recruitment as

a set of practices to help make sure your staff and volunteers are suitable to work with children and young people. It's a vital part of creating a safe and positive environment and making a commitment to keep children safe from harm.

In England and Wales, statutory guidance issued by the Department for Education directs how safer recruitment must be undertaken within an educational context.

== Recruitment process outsourcing ==
Recruitment process outsourcing (RPO) is a form of business process outsourcing (BPO) where a company engages a third-party provider to manage all or part of its recruitment process.

== Approaches ==
=== Internal recruitment ===
Internal recruitment or internal mobility (not to be confused with internal recruiters) refers to the process of a candidate being selected from the existing workforce to take up a new job in the same organization, perhaps as a promotion, or to provide career development opportunity, or to meet a specific or urgent organizational need. Advantages include the organization's familiarity with the employee and their competencies insofar as they are revealed in their current job, and their willingness to trust said employee. It can be quicker and have a lower cost to hire someone internally.

Many companies will choose to recruit or promote employees internally. This means that instead of searching for candidates in the general labor market, the company will look at hiring one of their own employees for the position. After searches that combine internal with external processes, companies often choose to hire an internal candidate over an external candidate due to the costs of acquiring new employees, and also on the fact that companies have pre-existing knowledge of their own employees' effectiveness in the workplace. Additionally, internal recruitment can encourage the development of skills and knowledge because employees anticipate longer careers at the company. However, promoting an employee can leave a gap at the promoted employee's previous position that subsequently needs to be filled. Traditionally, internal recruitment will be done through internal job postings. Another method of recruiting internally is through employee referrals. Having existing employees in good standing recommend coworkers for a job position is often a preferred method of recruitment because these employees know the values of the organization, as well as the work ethic of their coworkers. Some managers will provide incentives to employees who provide successful referrals.

=== External recruitment ===
Searching for candidates externally is another option when it comes to recruitment. In this case, employers or hiring committees will search outside of their own company for potential job candidates. The advantages of hiring externally is that it often brings fresh ideas and perspectives to the company. As well, external recruitment opens up more possibilities for the applicant pool than internal recruitment does. The conditions of the economy and labor market will impact the ability for a company to find and attract viable candidates. In order to make job openings known to potential candidates, companies will usually advertise their job in a number of ways. This can include advertising in local newspapers, journals, and online. Research has argued that social media networks offer job seekers and recruiters the opportunity to connect with other professionals cheaply. In addition, professional networking websites such as LinkedIn offer the ability to go through job seekers' biographical resumes and message them directly even if they are not actively looking for a job. Attending job fairs, especially at secondary and post-secondary schools, is another method of recruiting external candidates.

An employee referral program is a system where existing employees recommend prospective candidates for the job offered, and usually, if the suggested candidate is hired, the employee receives a cash bonus.

Niche firms tend to focus on building ongoing relationships with their candidates, as the same candidates may be placed many times throughout their careers. Online resources have developed to help find niche recruiters. Niche firms also develop knowledge on specific employment trends within their industry of focus (e.g., the energy industry) and are able to identify demographic shifts such as aging and its impact on the industry.

Social recruiting is the use of social media for recruiting. As more and more people are using the internet, social networking sites, or SNS, have become an increasingly popular tool used by companies to recruit and attract applicants. A study conducted by researchers found that 73.5% of Cypriot companies had an account on an SNS, the most common being Facebook, LinkedIn, and Twitter. There are many benefits associated with using SNS in recruitment, such as reducing the time required to hire someone, reduced costs, attracting more "computer literate, educated young individuals", and positively impacting the company's brand image. However, some disadvantages include increased costs for training HR specialists and installing related software for social recruiting. There are also legal issues associated with this practice, such as the privacy of applicants, discrimination based on information from SNS, and inaccurate or outdated information on applicant SNS.

Mobile recruiting is a recruitment strategy that uses mobile technology to attract, engage, and convert candidates.

Some recruiters work by accepting payments from job seekers, and in return help them to find a job. This is illegal in some countries, such as in the United Kingdom, in which recruiters must not charge candidates for their services (although websites such as LinkedIn may charge for ancillary job-search-related services). Such recruiters often refer to themselves as "personal marketers" and "job application services" rather than as recruiters.

Using multiple-criteria decision analysis tools such as analytic hierarchy process (AHP) and combining it with conventional recruitment methods provides an added advantage by helping the recruiters to make decisions when there are several diverse criteria to be considered or when the applicants lack past experience; for instance, recruitment of fresh university graduates.

Employers may re-recruit prior rejected candidates or recruit from retired employees as a way to increase the chances for attractive qualified applicants.

== Multi-tier recruitment model ==
In some companies where the recruitment volume is high, it is common to see a multi-tier recruitment model where the different sub-functions are grouped together to achieve efficiency.

An example of a three-tier recruitment model:

- Tier 1 - Contact/help desk - This tier acts as the first point of contact where recruitment requests are being raised. If the requests are simple to fulfil or are queries in nature, resolution may take place at this tier.
- Tier 2 - Administration - This tier manages mainly the administration processes
- Tier 3 - Process - This tier manages the process and how the requests get fulfilled

=== General ===
Organizations define their own recruiting strategies to identify who they will recruit, as well as when, where, and how that recruitment should take place. Common recruiting strategies answer the following questions:

- What type of individuals should be targeted?
- What recruitment message should be communicated?
- How can the targeted individuals best be reached?
- When should the recruitment campaign begin?
- What should be the nature of a site visit?

=== Practices ===
Organizations develop recruitment objectives, and the recruitment strategy follows these objectives. Typically, organizations develop pre- and post-hire objectives and incorporate these objectives into a holistic recruitment strategy. Once an organization deploys a recruitment strategy it conducts recruitment activities. This typically starts by advertising a vacant position.

=== Professional associations ===
There are numerous professional associations for human resources professionals. Such associations typically offer benefits such as member directories, publications, discussion groups, awards, local chapters, vendor relations, government lobbying, and job boards.

Professional associations also offer a recruitment resource for human resources professionals.

== See also ==
- Candidate submittal
- Counter-recruitment
- Dismissal (employment)
- Ethnic penalty
- Employment agency
- Human resource consulting
- Human resource management
- Industrial and organizational psychology
- Knowledge process outsourcing
- Legal outsourcing
- Military recruitment
- Onboarding
- Outsourcing
- Personality–job fit theory
- Personnel selection
- Recruiting metrics
- Smart contract: can be used in employment contracts
- Structured interview
- Trends in pre-employment screening

=== Recruiting companies ===
- List of employment agencies
- List of employment websites
- List of executive search firms
- List of temporary employment agencies
