= Retail Post Outlet =

Retail Post Outlet or RPO is a term used by Canada Post to designate a facility in a retail business, such as a grocery store or pharmacy, "for the purpose of providing postal retail sales and services and, in some cases, limited delivery services to the general public".
