= Mobile recruiting =

Mobile Recruiting is a recruitment strategy that uses mobile technology to attract, engage and convert candidates. Common mobile recruiting tactics include mobile career sites, mobile recruiting by text, mobile recruiting apps and social recruiting. Mobile recruiting is often cited as a growing opportunity for recruiters to connect with candidates more efficiently with "over 89% of job seekers saying their mobile device will be an important tool and resource for their job search." Traditionally, recruiters have used emails and phone calls to engage candidates, but the increase in mobile usage among job seekers has contributed to mobile recruiting's rising popularity.

== Mobile Career Sites ==
Mobile career sites are browser-based, mobile-friendly career sites that use responsive design so candidates can easily research career opportunities and apply for them via their mobile devices. These career sites typically bypass resumes and cover letters since these documents can make it difficult to apply via mobile devices, and allow applicants to use social media profiles instead.

== Mobile Recruiting by Text ==
Mobile recruiting by text uses text messaging to attract and engage candidates on their mobile devices. Recruiters can attract candidates by placing a short code and keyword such as text "jobs" to "55555" in locations such as universities, corporate campuses, retail locations, hospitals and restaurants to grow their candidate pipeline. Recruiters can also engage candidates on their mobile devices using text messaging to notify them of new career opportunities, schedule interviews and manage employee onboarding.

== Mobile Recruiting Apps ==
Mobile recruiting apps are mobile apps that recruiters can use to post career opportunities that are optimized for mobile devices, and candidates can use to submit job applications. They are not browser-based and require job seekers to download a mobile app.

== Social Recruiting ==
Social recruiting is recruiting candidates by using social platforms as talent databases and for employer branding, and is considered a type of mobile recruiting when attracting or engaging candidates on their mobile devices.
