= List of laws named after people =

Adages and sayings named after a person

This list of eponymous laws provides links to articles on laws, principles, adages, and other succinct observations or predictions named after a person. In some cases the person named has coined the law – such as Parkinson's law. In others, the work or publications of the individual have led to the law being so named – as is the case with Moore's law. There are also laws ascribed to individuals by others, such as Murphy's law; or given eponymous names despite the absence of the named person. Named laws range from significant scientific laws such as Newton's laws of motion, to humorous examples such as Murphy's law.

== A–B ==
- Acton's dictum: "Power tends to corrupt, and absolute power corrupts absolutely. Great men are almost always bad men [...]"
- Aitken's law describes how vowel length in Scots and Scottish English is conditioned by environment. Named for Professor A. J. Aitken, who formulated it.
- Alder's razor: See Newton's flaming laser sword below.
- Allen's rule: Endotherms from colder climates usually have shorter limbs (or appendages) than the equivalent animals from warmer climates.
- Amagat's law describes the behaviour and properties of mixtures of ideal gases. Named for Émile Amagat.
- Amara's law: "We tend to overestimate the effect of a technology in the short run and underestimate the effect in the long run." Named after Roy Amara (1925–2007).
- Amdahl's law is used to find out the maximum expected improvement to an overall system when only a part of it is improved. Named after Gene Amdahl (1922–2015).
- Ampère's circuital law, in physics, relates the circulating magnetic field in a closed loop to the electric current through the loop. Discovered by André-Marie Ampère.
- Ampère's force law, in physics, relates the mutual force between two parallel electrical conductors to the electric current flowing through them, and their separation distance.
- Anderson's rule is used for the construction of energy band diagrams of the heterojunction between two semiconductor materials. Named for R. L. Anderson.
- Anderson's rule (computer science) refers to a trilemma of security, functionality, and scale, of systems that handle sensitive personal information. Named for Ross J. Anderson.
- Andy and Bill's law describes how, when a computer chip is released, new software will be released to use up all of its power. Named for Andy Grove, then CEO of Intel, and Bill Gates, then CEO of Microsoft.
- Arbia's law of geography states "Everything is related to everything else, but things observed at a coarse spatial resolution are more related than things observed at a finer resolution." Named for Italian statistician Giuseppe Arbia.
- Archie's law, in petrophysics, relates the in-situ electrical conductivity of sedimentary rock to its porosity and brine saturation. Named for Gus Archie (1907–1978).
- Archimedes' lever: "Give me a lever long enough and a fulcrum on which to place it, and I shall move the world".
- Archimedes' principle indicates that the upward buoyant force that is exerted on a body immersed in a fluid, whether fully or partially submerged, is equal to the weight of the fluid that the body displaces. Named for Archimedes.
- Artin reciprocity law is a general theorem in number theory that forms a central part of global class field theory. Named after Emil Artin.
- Ashby's law of requisite variety, that the number of states in a control mechanism must be greater than or equal to the number of states in the system it controls.
- Asimov's Three Laws of Robotics formulated by Isaac Asimov:
  - A robot may not injure a human being or, through inaction, allow a human being to come to harm.
  - A robot must obey the orders given it by human beings, except where such orders would conflict with the First Law.
  - A robot must protect its own existence as long as such protection does not conflict with the First or Second Laws. (Asimov later added what became known as the "Zeroth Law", to precede the initial three: A robot may not harm humanity, or, by inaction, allow humanity to come to harm.)
- Atwood's law: Any software that can be written in JavaScript will eventually be written in JavaScript.
- Augustine's laws on air force management. 52 humorous laws formulated by Norman R. Augustine.
- Avogadro's law, one of the gas laws, states that: "equal volumes of all gases, at the same temperature and pressure, have the same number of molecules."
- Babinet's principle, in physics, states that the diffraction pattern from an opaque body is identical to that from a hole of the same size and shape except for the overall forward beam intensity. Named for Jacques Babinet.
- Baldwin's rules predict feasibility of ring-closing reactions in organic synthesis, proposed by Jack Baldwin.
- Barlow's law was an incorrect physical law proposed by Peter Barlow in 1825 to describe the ability of wires to conduct electricity.
- Bayes' theorem describes the probability of an event, based on prior knowledge of conditions that might be related to the event.
- Bechdel test, AKA Bechdel–Wallace test, measures representation of women in film and other fiction by asking if a work features at least two women who have a conversation about something other than a man. Named for Alison Bechdel.
- Beckstrom's law, in economics, states that the value of a network equals the net value added to each user's transactions conducted through that network, summed over all users. Named for Rod Beckstrom.
- Bedrosian's theorem in signal processing: the Hilbert transform of the product of a low-pass and a high-pass signal with non-overlapping spectra is given by the product of the low-pass signal and the Hilbert transform of the high-pass signal.
- Beer–Lambert law: in optics, the empirical relationship of the absorption of light to the properties of the material through which the light is traveling. Independently discovered (in various forms) by Pierre Bouguer in 1729, Johann Heinrich Lambert in 1760 and August Beer in 1852.
- Benford's law: In many collections of data, a given data point has roughly a 30% chance of starting with the digit 1.
- Benford's law of controversy: Passion is inversely proportional to the amount of real information available.
- Bennett's laws are principles in quantum information theory. Named for Charles H. Bennett.
- Bergmann's rule: within a broadly distributed taxonomic clade, populations and species of larger size are found in colder environments, and species of smaller size are found in warmer regions.
- Bernoulli's principle, in fluid dynamics, describes the effect that flow has on pressure contributing lift to airfoils.
- Betteridge's law of headlines: "any headline which ends in a question mark can be answered by the word 'no'".
- Betz's law: No wind turbine can capture more than 16/27 (59.3%) of the kinetic energy in wind, independent of the design of the turbine, in open flow.
- Biot–Savart law describes the magnetic field set up by a steady current density. Named for Jean-Baptiste Biot and Félix Savart.
- Birch's law, in geophysics, establishes a linear relation of the compressional wave velocity of rocks and minerals of a constant average atomic weight. Named after Francis Birch.
- Bloch's law: in human vision, the product of contrast and luminosity is a constant for small targets below the resolution limit.
- Bode's law, another name for the Titius–Bode law.
- Born's law, in quantum mechanics, gives the probability that a measurement on a quantum system will yield a given result. Named after physicist Max Born.
- Boyle's law, in physics, one of the gas laws, states that the volume and pressure of an ideal gas of fixed mass held at a constant temperature are inversely proportional, or, that the product of absolute pressure and volume of a fixed mass is always constant. Discovered by and named after Robert Boyle (1627–1691).
- Bradford's law is a pattern described by Samuel C. Bradford in 1934 that estimates the exponentially diminishing returns of extending a library search.
- Bragg's law, in physics, gives the angles for coherent and incoherent scattering from a crystal lattice.
- Brandolini's law: The amount of energy needed to refute bullshit is an order of magnitude bigger than to produce it. Named after Italian programmer Alberto Brandolini.
- Brewster's law, an angle of incidence at which light with a particular polarization is perfectly transmitted through a transparent dielectric surface, with no reflection. Named after Scottish physicist David Brewster.
- Briffault's law: "The female, not the male, determines all the conditions of the animal family. Where the female can derive no benefit from association with the male, no such association takes place." Named after Robert Briffault.
- Brooks's law: "Adding manpower to a late software project makes it later." Named after Fred Brooks, author of the well known book on project management The Mythical Man-Month.
- Buys Ballot's law is concerned with the notion that the wind travels counterclockwise around low pressure zones in the Northern Hemisphere. Named for C. H. D. Buys Ballot, who published an empirical validation of an existing theory, in 1857.
- Byerlee's law gives the stress circumstances in the Earth's crust at which fracturing along a geological fault takes place.

== C–D ==
- Campbell's law: "The more any quantitative social indicator is used for social decision making, the more subject it will be to corruption pressures and the more apt it will be to distort and corrupt the social processes it is intended to monitor." Named after Donald T. Campbell (1916–1996).
- Casper's Dictum is a law in forensic medicine that states the ratio of time a body takes to putrefy in different substances – 1:2:8 in air, water and earth.
- Cassie's law describes the effective contact angle θ_{c} for a liquid on a composite surface.
- Cassini's laws provide a compact description of the motion of the Moon. Established in 1693 by Giovanni Domenico Cassini.
- Celine's laws are a series of three laws regarding government and social interaction attributed to the fictional character Hagbard Celine from Robert Anton Wilson's The Illuminatus! Trilogy.
- Chargaff's rules state that DNA from any cell of all organisms should have a 1:1 ratio (base Pair Rule) of pyrimidine and purine bases and, more specifically, that the amount of guanine is equal to cytosine and the amount of adenine is equal to thymine. Discovered by Austrian chemist Erwin Chargaff.
- Charles's law, one of the gas laws in physics, states that at constant pressure the volume of a given mass of a gas increases or decreases by the same factor as its temperature (in kelvin) increases or decreases. Named after Jacques Charles.
- Chekhov's gun states that nonessential elements of a story must be removed.
- Cheops law: Nothing ever gets built on schedule or within budget.
- Chesterton's fence states that reforms should not be made until the reasoning behind the existing state of affairs is understood.
- Child's law states that the space-charge limited current in a plane-parallel diode varies directly as the three-halves power of the anode voltage and inversely as the square of the distance separating the cathode and the anode. Named after Clement D. Child; also known as the Child–Langmuir law (after Irving Langmuir). See also Mott–Gurney law.
- Chladni's law relates the frequency of modes of vibration for flat circular surfaces with fixed center as a function of the numbers of diametric (linear) nodes and of radial (circular) nodes. Named after Ernst Chladni.
- Claasen's law, or the logarithmic law of usefulness: usefulness = log(technology).
- Clarke's three laws, formulated by Arthur C. Clarke. Several corollaries to these laws have also been proposed.
  - First law: When a distinguished but elderly scientist states that something is possible, he is almost certainly right. When he states that something is impossible, he is very probably wrong.
  - Second law: The only way of discovering the limits of the possible is to venture a little way past them into the impossible.
  - Third law: Any sufficiently advanced technology is indistinguishable from magic.
- Collingridge's dilemma: Technology can only be regulated well if its impacts are known, but once a technology is known it is often too entrenched to be regulated. Named after David Collingridge.
- Conquest's three laws of politics:
  - First law: Everyone is conservative about what he knows best
  - Second law: Any organization not explicitly right-wing sooner or later becomes left-wing.
  - Third law: The simplest way to explain the behavior of any bureaucratic organization is to assume that it is controlled by a cabal of its enemies.
- Conway's law: Any piece of software reflects the organizational structure that produced it. Named after Melvin Conway.
- Cooper's law: The number of radio frequency conversations which can be concurrently conducted in a given area doubles every 30 months.
- Cope's rule: Population lineages tend to increase in body size over evolutionary time.
- Coulomb's law is an inverse-square law indicating the magnitude and direction of electrostatic force that one stationary, electrically charged object of small dimensions (ideally, a point source) exerts on another. It is named after Charles-Augustin de Coulomb.
- Cramer's rule: In linear algebra, an explicit formula for the solution of a system of linear equations with as many equations as unknowns, valid whenever the system has a unique solution. Named after Swiss mathematician Gabriel Cramer.
- Crane's law: there is no such thing as a free lunch.
- Cromwell's rule states that the use of prior probabilities of 0 ("the event will definitely not occur") or 1 ("the event will definitely occur") should be avoided, except when applied to statements that are logically true or false, such as 2+2 equaling 4 or 5.
- Cunningham's law: The best way to get the right answer on the Internet is not to ask a question, but to post the wrong answer. Attributed to Ward Cunningham by Steven McGeady.
- Curie's law: In a paramagnetic material the magnetization of the material is (approximately) directly proportional to an applied magnetic field. Named after Pierre Curie.
- Curie–Weiss law: describes the magnetic susceptibility χ of a ferromagnet in the paramagnetic region above the Curie point. Named after Pierre Curie and Pierre-Ernest Weiss.
- D'Alembert's principle: The sum of the differences between the forces acting on a system of mass particles and the time derivatives of the momenta of the system itself along any virtual displacement consistent with the constraints of the system, is zero. Named after Jean le Rond d'Alembert.
- Dahl's law, a sound rule of Northeast Bantu languages, a case of voicing dissimilation.
- Dale's principle, in neuroscience, states that a neuron is capable of producing and secreting only one neurotransmitter from its axon terminals. Named after Henry Hallett Dale but more recent data suggests it to be false. A more common interpretation of the original statement made by Dale is that neurons release the same set of transmitters at all of their synapses.
- Dalton's law, in chemistry and physics, states that the total pressure exerted by a gaseous mixture is equal to the sum of the partial pressures of each individual component in a gas mixture. Also called Dalton's law of partial pressure, and related to the ideal gas laws, this empirical law was observed by John Dalton in 1801.
- Darcy's law, in hydrogeology, describes the flow of a fluid (such as water) through a porous medium (such as an aquifer).
- Davis's law, in anatomy, describes how soft tissue models along imposed demands. Corollary to Wolff's law.
- De Morgan's laws apply to formal logic regarding the negation of pairs of logical operators.
- Dermott's law: The sidereal period of major satellites tends to follow a geometric series. Named after Stanley Dermott.
- De Vaucouleurs's law, in astronomy, describes how the surface brightness of an elliptical galaxy varies as a function of apparent distance from the center. Named after Gérard de Vaucouleurs.
- Dilbert principle: "the most ineffective workers are systematically moved to the place where they can do the least damage: management." Coined by Scott Adams.
- Doctorow's law: "Anytime someone puts a lock on something you own, against your wishes, and doesn't give you the key, they're not doing it for your benefit."
- Dolbear's law is an empirical relationship between temperature and the rate of cricket chirping.
- Dollo's law: "An organism is unable to return, even partially, to a previous stage already realized in the ranks of its ancestors." Simply put this law states that evolution is not reversible; the "law" is regarded as a generalisation as exceptions may exist.
- Dulong–Petit law states the classical expression for the specific heat capacity of a crystal due to its lattice vibrations. Named for Pierre Louis Dulong and Alexis Thérèse Petit.
- Dunbar's number is a theoretical cognitive limit to the number of people with whom one can maintain stable social relationships. No precise value has been proposed for Dunbar's number, but a commonly cited approximation is 150. First proposed by British anthropologist Robin Dunbar.
- Dunning–Kruger effect is a cognitive bias in which people who are unskilled in some area wrongly believe their ability is higher than average; they don't know enough about the subject to accurately measure their aptitude. People with well-above-average skills are acutely aware of how much they don't know of the subject, but less aware of the general ineptitude of others, so tend to underestimate their relative ability.
- Duverger's law: Winner-take-all (or first-past-the-post) electoral systems tend to create a two-party system, while proportional representation tends to create a multiple-party system. Named for Maurice Duverger.

== E–G ==
- Edholm's law predicts that bandwidth and data rates double every 18 months. Named for Phil Edholm.
- Einasto's law relates the density of a galaxy to distance from the center. Named for Jaan Einasto.
- Elliott wave principle is a form of technical analysis that finance traders use to analyze financial market cycles and forecast market trends by identifying extremes in investor psychology, highs and lows in prices, and other collective factors. Named for American accountant Ralph Nelson Elliott.
- El-Sayed rule, in physical chemistry states that "the rate of intersystem crossing (same energy radiationless transition between two electronic states), e.g. from the lowest singlet state to the triplet manifold, is relatively large if it involves a change of molecular orbital type"
- Emmert's law, in optics: objects that generate retinal images of the same size will look different in physical size (linear size) if they appear to be located at different distances. Named for Emil Emmert.
- Engelbart's law: "The intrinsic rate of human performance is exponential."
- Eroom's law, the observation that drug discovery is becoming slower and more expensive over time, despite improvements in technology. The name "Eroom" is "Moore" spelled backward, in order to contrast it with Moore's law.
- Euler's laws of motion: extends Newton's laws of motion for point particle to rigid body motion.
- Faraday's law of induction: a magnetic field changing in time creates a proportional electromotive force. Named for Michael Faraday, based on his work in 1831.
- Faraday's law of electrolysis: the mass of a substance produced at an electrode during electrolysis is proportional to the number of moles of electrons transferred at that electrode; again named for Michael Faraday.
- Faxén's law: In fluid dynamics, Faxén's laws relate a sphere's velocity and angular velocity to the forces, torque, stresslet and flow it experiences under low Reynolds number (creeping flow) conditions.
- Fick's laws of diffusion describe diffusion, and define the diffusion coefficient. Derived by Adolf Fick in 1855.
- Finagle's law: "Anything that can go wrong, will—at the worst possible moment." or "The perversity of the Universe tends towards a maximum."
- Fisher's fundamental theorem of natural selection states "The rate of increase in fitness of any organism at any time is equal to its genetic variance in fitness at that time."
- Fitts's law is a principle of human movement published in 1954 by Paul Fitts which predicts the time required to move from a starting position to a final target area. Fitts's law is used to model the act of pointing, both in the real world, e.g. with a hand or finger, and on a computer, e.g. with a mouse.
- Flynn effect describes the phenomenon of an increase in IQ test scores for many populations at an average rate of three IQ points per decade since the early 20th century.
- Fourier's law, also known as the law of heat conduction, states that the time rate of heat flow Q through a slab (or a portion of a perfectly insulated wire) is proportional to the gradient of temperature difference; named for Joseph Fourier.
- Frege's principle: The meaning of a complex expression is determined by the meanings of its constituent expressions and the rules used to combine them.
- Gall's law: "A complex system that works is invariably found to have evolved from a simple system that worked."
- Gause's law, in ecology, the competitive exclusion principle: "complete competitors cannot coexist."
- Gauss's law, in physics, gives the relation between the electric flux flowing out a closed surface and the charge enclosed in the surface. It was formulated by Carl Friedrich Gauss. See also Gauss's law for gravity, and Gauss's law for magnetism.
- Gay-Lussac's law: "The pressure of a fixed mass and fixed volume of a gas is directly proportional to the gas's temperature."
- Gell-Mann amnesia effect: Believing newspaper articles outside one's area of expertise, even after acknowledging that neighboring articles in one's area of expertise are completely wrong.
- Gérson's law: "An advantage should be taken in every situation, regardless of ethics."
- Gibrat's law: "The size of a firm and its growth rate are independent."
- Gibson's law: "For every PhD there is an equal and opposite PhD."
- Ginsberg's theorem is a set of adages based on the laws of thermodynamics.
- Gloger's rule, an ecogeographical rule which states: within a species of endotherms, more heavily pigmented forms tend to be found in more humid environments. It was coined by Constantin Wilhelm Lambert Gloger.
- Godwin's law, an adage in Internet culture: "As an online discussion grows longer, the probability of a comparison involving Nazis or Hitler approaches one." Coined by Mike Godwin in 1990.
- Gompertz–Makeham law of mortality: the death rate is the sum of an age-independent component and an age-dependent component.
- Goodhart's law: When a measure becomes a target, it ceases to be a good measure.
- Gossen's laws are three laws in economics relating to utility and value, formulated by Hermann Heinrich Gossen.
- Graham's Hierarchy of Disagreement: a taxonomy of argument strategy, from refutations to base insults.
- Graham's law, a gas law in physics: the average kinetic energy of the molecules of two samples of different gases at the same temperature is identical. It is named for Thomas Graham (1805–1869), who formulated it.
- Grassmann's law: A dissimilatory phonological process in Ancient Greek and Sanskrit which states that if an aspirated consonant is followed by another aspirated consonant in the next syllable, the first one loses the aspiration. Named after its discoverer Hermann Grassmann.
- Grassmann's law (optics), an empirical result about human color perception: that chromatic sensation can be described in terms of an effective stimulus consisting of linear combinations of different light colors.
- Greenspun's tenth rule: Any sufficiently complicated C or Fortran program contains an ad hoc, informally specified, bug-ridden, slow implementation of half of Common Lisp; coined by Philip Greenspun.
- Gresham's law is typically stated as "Bad money drives good money out of circulation", but more accurately "Bad money drives good money out of circulation if their exchange rate is set by law." Coined in 1858 by British economist Henry Dunning Macleod, and named for Sir Thomas Gresham (1519–1579). The principle had been stated before Gresham by others, including Nicolaus Copernicus.
- Grimm's law explains correspondence between some consonants in Germanic languages and those in other Indo-European languages. Discovered by Jacob Grimm, (1785–1863), German philologist and mythologist and one of the Brothers Grimm.
- Grosch's law: the economic value of computation increases with the square root of the increase in speed; that is, to do a calculation 10 times as cheaply you must do it 100 times as fast. Stated by Herb Grosch in 1965.
- Grotthuss–Draper law: only that light which is absorbed by a system can bring about a photochemical change. Named for Theodor Grotthuss and John William Draper.
- Gustafson's law (also known as Gustafson–Barsis's law) in computer engineering: any sufficiently large problem can be efficiently parallelized. Coined by John Gustafson in 1988.

== H–K ==
- Haber's rule is a mathematical statement relating the concentration of a poisonous gas and how long it must be breathed to result in death.
- Hack's law: a hydrological law relating longest stream length in a basin with the area of the basin. Named after John Tilton Hack.
- Hagen–Poiseuille law: a physical law that gives the pressure drop in an incompressible and Newtonian fluid in laminar flow flowing through a long cylindrical pipe of constant cross section. Named after Gotthilf Hagen and Jean Poiseuille.
- Haitz's law is an observation and forecast about the steady improvement, over many years, of light-emitting diodes (LEDs).
- Hamilton's principle: the dynamics of a physical system is determined by a variational problem for a functional based on a single function, the Lagrangian, which contains all physical information concerning the system and the forces acting on it. Named after William Rowan Hamilton.
- Hanlon's razor is a corollary of Finagle's law, named in allusion to Occam's razor, normally taking the form "Never attribute to malice that which can be adequately explained by stupidity." As with Finagle, possibly not strictly eponymous. Alternatively, "Do not invoke conspiracy as explanation when ignorance and incompetence will suffice, as conspiracy implies intelligence."
- Hartley's law is a way to quantify information and its line rate in an analog communications channel. Named for Ralph Hartley (1888–1970).
- Hasse principle is the idea that one can find an integer solution to an equation by using the Chinese remainder theorem to piece together solutions modulo powers of each different prime number. Named after Helmut Hasse.
- Hauser's law is an empirical observation about U.S. tax receipts as a percentage of GDP, theorized to be a natural equilibrium.
- The Hayflick limit, or Hayflick phenomenon, is the number of times a normal somatic, differentiated human cell population will divide before cell division stops. Named after anatomist Leonard Hayflick, the name "Hayflick limit" was coined by Macfarlane Burnet in his book Intrinsic Mutagenesis: A Genetic Approach to Ageing.
- Heaps's law describes the number of distinct words in a document (or set of documents) as a function of the document length.
- Hebb's law: "Neurons that fire together wire together."
- Heisenberg's uncertainty principle: one cannot measure values (with arbitrary precision) of certain conjugate quantities, which are pairs of observables of a single elementary particle. The most familiar of these pairs is position and momentum.
- Henry's law: The mass of a gas that dissolves in a definite volume of liquid is directly proportional to the pressure of the gas provided the gas does not react with the solvent.
- Henry George theorem states that under certain conditions, aggregate spending by government on public goods will increase aggregate rent based on land value (land rent) more than that amount, with the benefit of the last marginal investment equaling its cost.
- Hertzsprung–Russell diagram, showing the relationship between stars' luminosities and temperatures.
- Hess's law, in physical chemistry: the total enthalpy change during the complete course of a reaction is the same whether the reaction is made in one step or in several steps.
- Hick's law, in psychology, describes the time it takes for a person to make a decision as a function of the number of possible choices.
- Hickam's dictum, in medicine, is commonly stated as "Patients can have as many diseases as they damn well please" and is a counterargument to the use of Occam's razor.
- Hilt's law, states the deeper the coal, the higher its rank (grade). Named after professor Carl Hilt (1873).
- Hitchens's razor is an epistemological principle maintaining that the burden of evidence in a debate rests on the claim maker, and that the opponent can dismiss the claim if this burden is not met: "That which can be asserted without evidence can be dismissed without evidence."
- Hofstadter's law: "It always takes longer than you expect, even when you take into account Hofstadter's law" (Douglas Hofstadter, Gödel, Escher, Bach, 1979).
- Hooke's law: The tension on a spring or other elastic object is proportional to the displacement from the equilibrium. Frequently cited in Latin as "Ut tensio sic vis." Named after Robert Hooke (1635–1703).
- Hotelling's law in economics: Under some conditions, it is rational for competitors to make their products as nearly identical as possible.
- Hubble's law: Galaxies recede from an observer at a rate proportional to their distance to that observer. Formulated by Edwin Hubble in 1929.
- Hume's law, in meta-ethics: normative statements cannot be deduced exclusively from descriptive statements.
- Hume-Rothery rules, named after William Hume-Rothery, are a set of basic rules that describe the conditions under which an element could dissolve in a metal, forming a solid solution.
- Humphrey's law: conscious attention to a task normally performed automatically can impair its performance. Described by psychologist George Humphrey in 1923.
- Hund's rules are three rules in atomic physics used to determine the term symbol that corresponds to the ground state of a multi-electron atom. Named after Friedrich Hund.
- Hutber's law: "Improvement means deterioration." Coined by financial journalist Patrick Hutber.
- Hyrum's Law: "With a sufficient number of users of a [computer software] API, it does not matter what you promise in the contract: all observable behaviors of your system will be depended on by somebody."
- Isaac Bonewits's laws of magic are synthesized from a multitude of belief systems from around the world, collected in order to explain and categorize magical beliefs within a cohesive framework.
- Jevons paradox: a decrease in the cost of something doesn't reduce the spend on that thing, it actually leads to more consumption.
- Joule's laws are heat laws related to electricity and to gases, named for James Prescott Joule.
- Joy's law in management: the principle that "no matter who you are, most of the smartest people work for someone else", attributed to Sun Microsystems co-founder Bill Joy.
- Kepler's laws of planetary motion describe the motion of the planets around the sun. First articulated by Johannes Kepler.
- Kerckhoffs's principle of secure cryptography: A cryptosystem should be secure even if everything about the system, except the key, is public.
- Kirchhoff's laws are named after Gustav Kirchhoff and cover thermodynamics, thermochemistry, electrical circuits and spectroscopy (see Kirchhoff's laws (disambiguation)).
- Kleiber's law: for the vast majority of animals, an animal's metabolic rate scales to the 3/4 power of the animal's mass. Named after Max Kleiber.
- Kluge's law: a sound law that purports to explain the origin of the Proto-Germanic long consonants. Named after Friedrich Kluge.
- Koomey's law: the energy of computation is halved every year and a half.
- Kopp's law: The molecular heat capacity of a solid compound is the sum of the atomic heat capacities of the elements composing it. Named for Hermann Franz Moritz Kopp.
- Korte's law: The greater the length of a path between two successively presented stimuli, the greater the stimulus onset asynchrony must be for an observer to perceive the two stimuli as a single moving object.
- Kranzberg's laws of technology: The first law states that technology is neither good nor bad; nor is it neutral.
- Kryder's law: on growth of density of magnetic disk storage, compared to Moore's law.

== L–M ==
- L'Hôpital's rule uses derivatives to find limits of indeterminate forms 0/0 or ±∞/∞, and only applies to such cases.
- Lachmann's law is a phonological rule of thumb for Latin vowel sounds, named for Karl Lachmann, the textual critic and philologist.
- Lamarck's theory of evolution has two laws: The first can be paraphrased as "use it or lose it". The second is the more famous law of soft inheritance.
- Lambert's cosine law describes the radiant intensity observed from an ideal diffusely reflecting surface or ideal diffuse radiator.
- Lanchester's laws are formulae for calculating the relative strengths of predator/prey pair and application in military conflict.
- Landauer's principle: there is a minimum possible amount of energy required to change one bit of information, known as the Landauer limit.
- LaSalle's invariance principle is a criterion for the asymptotic stability of an autonomous (possibly nonlinear) dynamical system. Named for mathematician Joseph P. LaSalle.
- Leavitt's law: In astronomy, a period-luminosity relation linking the luminosity of pulsating variable stars with their pulsation period. Named for American astronomer Henrietta Swan Leavitt.
- Lehman's laws of software evolution
- Leibniz's law is a principle in metaphysics also known as the Identity of Indiscernibles. It states: "If two objects have all their properties in common, then they are one and the same object."
- Lenz's law: An induced current is always in such a direction as to oppose the motion or change causing it. Named for Russian physicist Emil Lenz.
- Lem's law: "No one reads; if someone does read, he doesn't understand, if he understands, he immediately forgets."
- Lewis's law: "The comments on any article about feminism justify feminism." Named for English journalist Helen Lewis.
- Lightwood's law: In medicine, states that bacterial infections will tend to localise while viral infections will tend to spread.
- Liebig's law of the minimum: The growth or distribution of a plant is dependent on the one environmental factor most critically in demand.
- Lindy's Law: the life expectancy of something is proportional to its current age. Something that has been around for a long time is likely to also remain around for a long time.
- Linus's law: "Given enough eyeballs, all bugs are shallow." Named for Linus Torvalds.
- Little's law, in queuing theory: "The average number of customers in a stable system (over some time interval) is equal to their average arrival rate, multiplied by their average time in the system." The law was named for John Little from results of experiments in 1961.
- Littlewood's law: individuals can expect miracles to happen to them, at the rate of about one per month. Coined by J. E. Littlewood, (1885–1977).
- Liskov substitution principle in computer science is a particular definition of a subtyping relation, called (strong) behavioral subtyping.
- Llinás's law: "A neuron of a given kind cannot be functionally replaced by one of another type even if their synaptic connectivity and the type of neurotransmitter outputs are identical." Named for neuroscientist Rodolfo Llinás.
- Lorentz force law defines the force on a moving charged particle in electric and magnetic fields.
- Lotka's law, in infometrics: the number of authors publishing a certain number of articles is a fixed ratio to the number of authors publishing a single article. As the number of articles published increases, authors producing that many publications become less frequent. For example, there may be 1/4 as many authors publishing two articles within a specified time period as there are single-publication authors, 1/9 as many publishing three articles, 1/16 as many publishing four articles, etc. Though the law itself covers many disciplines, the actual ratios involved are very discipline-specific.
- Lucas critique: "argues that it is naïve to try to predict the effects of a change in economic policy entirely on the basis of relationships observed in historical data, especially highly aggregated historical data."
- Madelung rule: the order in which atomic orbitals are filled according to the aufbau principle. Named for Erwin Madelung. Also known as the Janet rule or the Klechkowski rule (after Charles Janet or Vsevolod Klechkovsky).
- Maes–Garreau law: most favorable predictions about future technology will fall around latest possible date they can come true and still remain in the lifetime of the person making the prediction.
- Malthusian growth model, also referred to as the Malthusian law or simple exponential growth model, is exponential growth based on a constant rate. The model is named after Thomas Robert Malthus, who wrote An Essay on the Principle of Population (1798), one of the earliest and most influential books on population.
- Mandela Effect, specific false memories can sometimes be shared by a large group of people.
- Marconi's law empirically relates radio communication distance to antenna tower height.
- Maxwell's equations a set of coupled partial differential equations that, together with the Lorentz force law, form the foundation of classical electromagnetism, classical optics, and electric circuits.
- Meadow's law is a precept, now discredited, that since cot deaths are so rare, "One is a tragedy, two is suspicious and three is murder, until proved otherwise." It was named for Roy Meadow, a discredited paediatrician prominent in the United Kingdom in the last quarter of the twentieth century.
- Mendel's laws are named for the 19th century Austrian monk Gregor Mendel who determined the patterns of inheritance through his plant breeding experiments, working especially with peas. Mendel's first law, or the law of segregation, states that each organism has a pair of genes; that it inherits one from each parent, and that the organism will pass down only one of these genes to its own offspring. These different copies of the same gene are called alleles. Mendel's second law, the law of independent assortment, states that different traits will be inherited independently by the offspring.
- Menzerath's law, or Menzerath–Altmann law (named after Paul Menzerath and Gabriel Altmann), is a linguistic law according to which the increase of a linguistic construct results in a decrease of its constituents, and vice versa.
- Metcalfe's law, in communications and network theory: the value of a system grows as approximately the square of the number of users of the system. Framed by Robert Metcalfe in the context of Ethernet.
- Miller's law, in communication: "To understand what another person is saying, you must assume that it is true and try to imagine what it could be true of." Named after George Armitage Miller.
- Miller's rule, in optics, is an empirical rule which gives an estimate of the order of magnitude of the nonlinear coefficient.
- Monro–Kellie doctrine: The pressure–volume relationship between intracranial contents and cerebral perfusion pressure (CPP) states that the cranial compartment is inelastic and that the volume inside the cranium is fixed. The cranium and its constituents (blood, CSF, and brain tissue) create a state of volume equilibrium, such that any increase in volume of one of the cranial constituents must be compensated by a decrease in volume of another. *This concept only applies to adults, as the presence of fontanelles and open suture lines in infants that have not yet fused means there is potential for a change in size and intracranial volume.
- Morgan's canon "In no case is an animal activity to be interpreted in terms of higher psychological processes if it can be fairly interpreted in terms of processes which stand lower in the scale of psychological evolution and development."
- Mooers's law: "An information retrieval system will tend not to be used whenever it is more painful and troublesome for a customer to have information than for him not to have it." An empirical observation made by American computer scientist Calvin Mooers in 1959.
- Moore's law is an empirical observation stating that the complexity of integrated circuits doubles every 24 months. Outlined in 1965 by Gordon Moore, co-founder of Intel Corporation.
- Muller's ratchet where mutations in a species will tend to accumulate.
- Muphry's law: "If you write anything criticizing editing or proofreading, there will be a fault of some kind in what you have written." The name is a deliberate misspelling of "Murphy's law".
- Murphy's law: "Anything that can go wrong will go wrong." Ascribed to Edward A. Murphy, Jr. See also Sod's law.
- Murray's law states that, in physiological systems such as blood flow, no matter the diameter of the vessel, it will be structured such that minimal work is required to enable the maintenance of a steady state. Named after Cecil D. Murray.

== N–Q ==
- Naismith's rule is a rule of thumb that helps in the planning of a walking or hiking expedition by calculating how long it will take to walk the route, including ascents.
- Navier–Stokes equations: In physics, these equations describe the motion of viscous fluid substances. Named after Claude-Louis Navier and George Gabriel Stokes.
- Nernst equation: A chemical and thermodynamic relationship that permits the calculation of the reduction potential of a reaction.
- Neuhaus's law: Where orthodoxy is optional, orthodoxy will sooner or later be proscribed. This "law" had been expressed earlier. For example, Charles Porterfield Krauth wrote in his The Conservative Reformation: "Truth started with tolerating; it comes to be merely tolerated, and that only for a time. Error claims a preference for its judgments on all disputed points."
- Newton's flaming laser sword, also known as Alder's razor: What cannot be settled by experiment is not worth debating.
- Newton's law of cooling: The rate of cooling (or heating) of a body due to convection is proportional to the difference between the body temperature and the ambient temperature.
- Newton's laws of motion, in physics, are three scientific laws concerning the behaviour of moving bodies, which are fundamental to classical mechanics (and since Einstein, which are valid only within inertial reference frames). Discovered and stated by Isaac Newton (1643–1727), they can be formulated, in modern terms, as follows:
  - First law: A body remains at rest, or keeps moving in a straight line (at a constant velocity), unless acted upon by a net outside force.
  - Second law: The acceleration of an object of constant mass is proportional to the net force acting upon it.
  - Third law: Whenever one body exerts a force upon a second body, the second body exerts an equal and opposite force upon the first body.
- Newton's law of universal gravitation: Every particle in the universe attracts every other particle with a force that is proportional to the product of their masses and inversely proportional to the square of the distance between them.
- Nielsen's law: A high-end user's internet connection speed grows by 50% per year.
- Niven's laws: several aphorisms, including "If the universe of discourse permits the possibility of time travel and of changing the past, then no time machine will be invented in that universe."
- Noether's theorem: Every continuous symmetry in a physical system has a corresponding conservation law.
- Occam's razor: explanations should never multiply causes without necessity. ("Entia non sunt multiplicanda praeter necessitatem.") When two or more explanations are offered for a phenomenon, the simplest full explanation is preferable. Named after William of Ockham (c. 1285–1349).
- Oddo–Harkins rule: elements with an even atomic number are more common than those with odd atomic number. Named after Giuseppe Oddo and William Draper Harkins.
- Ohm's law, in physics: the ratio of the potential difference (or voltage drop) between the ends of a conductor (and resistor) to the current flowing through it is a constant. Discovered by and named after Georg Simon Ohm (1789–1854).
- Ohm's acoustic law is an empirical approximation concerning the perception of musical tones, named for Georg Simon Ohm.
- Okrent's law is Daniel Okrent's take on the argument to moderation.
- Okun's law, in economics: when unemployment increases by 1%, the annual GDP decreases by 2%.
- Orgel's rules, in evolutionary biology, are a set of axioms attributed to the evolutionary biologist Leslie Orgel:
  - First rule: "Whenever a spontaneous process is too slow or too inefficient a protein will evolve to speed it up or make it more efficient."
  - Second rule: "Evolution is cleverer than you are."
- Ostrom's law, in economics and property law: resource arrangements in practice can be represented in theory, such as arrangements of the commons or shared property.
- O'Sullivan's first law, in politics: "All organizations that are not actually right-wing will over time become left-wing."
- Overton window is the range of policies politically acceptable to the mainstream population at a given time
- Papert's principle: "Some of the most crucial steps in mental growth are based not simply on acquiring new skills, but on acquiring new administrative ways to use what one already knows."
- Pareto principle: for many phenomena 80% of consequences stem from 20% of the causes. Named after Italian economist Vilfredo Pareto, but framed by management thinker Joseph M. Juran.
- Parkinson's law: "Work expands to fill the time available for its completion." Corollary: "Expenditure rises to meet income." Coined by C. Northcote Parkinson (1909–1993).
- Parkinson's law of triviality: "The time spent on any agenda item will be in inverse proportion to the sum of money involved." Also due to C. Northcote Parkinson.
- Peltzman effect: Safety measures are offset by increased risk-taking.
- Peter principle: "In a hierarchy, every employee tends to rise to his level of incompetence." Coined by Dr. Laurence J. Peter (1919–1990) in his book The Peter Principle. In his follow-up book, The Peter Prescription, he offered possible solutions to the problems his principle could cause.
- Planck's law, in physics, describes the spectral radiance of a black body at a given temperature. After Max Planck.
- Plateau's laws describe the structure of soap films. Named after Belgian physicist Joseph Plateau.
- Poe's law (fundamentalism): "Without a winking smiley or other blatant display of humor, it is utterly impossible to parody a Creationist in such a way that someone won't mistake for the genuine article." Although it originally referred to creationism, the scope later widened to any form of extremism or fundamentalism.
- Poisson's law of large numbers: For independent random variables with a common distribution, the average value for a sample tends to the mean as sample size increases. Named after Siméon Denis Poisson (1781–1840) and derived from Recherches sur la probabilité des jugements en matière criminelle et en matière civile (1837: Research on the Probability of Criminal and Civil Verdicts).
- Postel's law: Be conservative in what you do; be liberal in what you accept from others. Derived from RFC 761 (Transmission Control Protocol, 1980) in which Jon Postel summarized earlier communications of desired interoperability criteria for the Internet Protocol (cf. IEN 111)
- Pournelle's iron law of bureaucracy: "In any bureaucracy, the people devoted to the benefit of the bureaucracy itself always get in control and those dedicated to the goals the bureaucracy is supposed to accomplish have less and less influence, and sometimes are eliminated entirely."
- Prandtl condition, to identify possible boundary layer separation points of incompressible fluid flows.
- Premack's principle: More probable behaviors will reinforce less probable behaviors. Named for David Premack (1925–2015)
- Price's law (Price's square root law) indicates that the square root of the number of all authors contribute half the publications in a given subject.
- Putt's law: Technology is dominated by two types of people: those who understand what they do not manage and those who manage what they do not understand.
- Putt's corollary: Every technical hierarchy, in time, develops a competence inversion.
- Pythagorean theorem: fundamental relation in Euclidean geometry among the three sides of a right triangle, that the square of the hypotenuse is equal to the sum of the squares of the other two sides.

== R–S ==
- Ramsey problem, the principle in economics that lower price elasticity of demand is optimally associated with greater markups or greater taxation.
- Raoult's law, in chemistry: that the vapor pressure of mixed liquids is dependent on the vapor pressures of the individual liquids and the molar fraction of each present in solution.
- Rayleigh–Jeans law: attempts to describe the spectral radiance of electromagnetic radiation at all wavelengths from a black body at a given temperature through classical arguments. Named after John William Strutt (Lord Rayleigh) and James Jeans.
- Reed's law: the utility of large networks, particularly social networks, can scale exponentially with the size of the network. Asserted by David P. Reed.
- Reilly's law of retail gravitation: People generally patronize the largest mall in the area.
- Rent's rule: In computing logic, the relationship between the number of external signal connections to a logic block (i.e., the number of "pins") with the number of logic gates in the logic block. Named for IBM employee E. F. Rent.
- Ribot's law: In amnesia, more recent memories are most affected.
- Ricco's law: In human vision, the product of contrast and area is a constant for small targets below the resolution limit.
- Roemer's law: A hospital bed built is a bed filled.
- Rosenthal effect, also known as the Pygmalion effect: Higher expectations lead to an increase in performance, or low expectations lead to a decrease in performance. Named after Robert Rosenthal.
- Rothbard's law: Everyone specializes in their own area of weakness.
- Russell's teapot: an analogy showing that the burden of proof of an empirically unfalsifiable claim lies upon the person making the claim, rather than it being accepted unless disproved. The assertion that an undetectable teapot orbits the Sun somewhere between the Earth and Mars should not be accepted, although not proven wrong.
- Sagan standard: Named for scientist Carl Sagan, who said that Extraordinary claims require extraordinary evidence.
- Sahm rule: Named for economist Claudia Sahm, the Sahm rule helps determine when an economy has entered the start of a recession, when the three-month moving average of the national unemployment rate (U3) rises by 0.50 percentage points or more relative to its low during the previous 12 months.
- Saint-Venant's principle states: "the difference between the effects of two different but statically equivalent loads becomes very small at sufficiently large distances from load." Named after Adhémar Jean Claude Barré de Saint-Venant.
- Sanderson's laws of magic created by Brandon Sanderson. These are creative writing guidelines that can be used to create magic systems in a fantasy story. These rules are able to help what is called hard magic systems in which the magic system follows specific rules that the reader knows and can understand.
  - An author's ability to solve conflict with magic is directly proportional to how well the reader understands said magic.
  - Weaknesses, limits and costs are more interesting than powers.
  - The author should expand on what is already a part of the magic system before something entirely new is added, as this may otherwise entirely change how the magic system fits into the fictional world.
  - Additional "Zeroth Law" is to always err on the side of what's awesome.
- Sapir–Whorf hypothesis: the structure and scope of the language that people use influences people's worldview and cognition.
- Sarnoff's law: The value of a broadcast network is proportional to the number of viewers.
- Say's law, attributed to economist Jean-Baptiste Say by economist John Maynard Keynes: "supply creates its own demand", i.e., if businesses produce more output in a free market economy, the wages and other payment for productive inputs will provide sufficient demand so that there is no general glut.
- Sayre's law: "In any dispute the intensity of feeling is inversely proportional to the value of the stakes at issue." By way of corollary, the law adds: "That is why academic politics are so bitter." Often attributed to Henry Kissinger.
- Schneier's law: "Anyone can create a cryptographic algorithm that he himself can't break. It's not even hard. What is hard is creating an algorithm that no one else can break".
- Schottky–Mott rule predicts the Schottky barrier height based on the vacuum work function of the metal relative to the vacuum electron affinity (or vacuum ionization energy) of the semiconductor. Named for Walter H. Schottky and Nevill Francis Mott.
- Segal's law: "A man with a watch knows what time it is. A man with two watches is never sure."
- Shermer's last law: "Any sufficiently advanced extraterrestrial intelligence is indistinguishable from God". This is a corollary to Clarke's third law.
- Shirky principle: "Institutions will try to preserve the problem to which they are the solution."
- Sievers's law, in Indo-European linguistics, accounts for the pronunciation of a consonant cluster with a glide (*w or *y) before a vowel as it was affected by the phonetics of the preceding syllable. Named after Germanic philologist Eduard Sievers (1859–1932).
- Sieverts's law, in physical metallurgy, is a rule to predict the solubility of gases in metals. Named after German chemist Adolf Sieverts (1874–1947).
- Smeed's law is an empirical rule relating traffic fatalities to traffic congestion as measured by the proxy of motor vehicle registrations and country population. After R. J. Smeed.
- Snell's law is the simple formula used to calculate the refraction of light when travelling between two media of differing refractive index. It is named after one of its discoverers, Dutch mathematician Willebrord van Roijen Snell (1580–1626).
- Sowa's law of standards: "Whenever a major organization develops a new system as an official standard for X, the primary result is the widespread adoption of some simpler system as a de facto standard for X."
- Spearman's hypothesis: The magnitudes of the black–white differences on tests of cognitive ability positively correlate with the tests' g-loading.
- Spearman's law of diminishing returns states that the g factor (general intelligence) decreases in predictive power for high IQs.
- Stang's law, in Proto-Indo-European phonology: when a word ends with a vowel followed by a laryngeal or a semivowel *y or *w followed by a nasal, the laryngeal or semivowel is dropped, with compensatory lengthening of a preceding vowel. Named after Norwegian linguist Christian Stang.
- Stark–Einstein law: every photon that is absorbed will cause a (primary) chemical or physical reaction. Named after Johannes Stark and Albert Einstein.
- Stefan–Boltzmann law: The total energy radiated per unit surface area of a black body in unit time is directly proportional to the fourth power of the black body's thermodynamic temperature. Named for Jožef Stefan (1835–1893) and Ludwig Boltzmann.
- Stein's law: If something cannot go on forever, it will stop. If a trend cannot go on forever, there is no need for action or a program to make it stop, much less to make it stop immediately; it will stop of its own accord.
- Stevens's power law, in psychophysics, relates the intensity of a stimulus to its perceived strength. It supersedes the Weber–Fechner law, since it can describe a wider range of sensations. The theory is named after its inventor, Stanley Smith Stevens (1906–1973).
- Stigler's law of eponymy: No scientific discovery is named after its original discoverer. Named by statistician Stephen Stigler who attributes it to sociologist Robert K. Merton, making the law self-referential.
- Stokes's law is an expression for the frictional force exerted on spherical objects with very small Reynolds numbers, named for George Gabriel Stokes (1819–1903).
- Stokes's law of sound attenuation is a formula for the attenuation of sound in a Newtonian fluid, such as water or air, due to the fluid's viscosity.
- Streisand effect: whereby an attempt to hide, remove, or censor a piece of information has the unintended consequence of publicizing the information more widely.
- Sturgeon's law: "Ninety percent of everything is crud." Derived from a quote by science fiction author Theodore Sturgeon (1918–1985).
- Sutton's law: "Go where the money is." Often cited in medical schools to teach new doctors to spend resources where they are most likely to pay off. The law is named after bank robber Willie Sutton, who when asked why he robbed banks, is claimed to have answered "Because that's where the money is."
- Swanson's law: solar cell prices fall 20% for every doubling of solar cell industry manufacturing capacity. The law is named after SunPower Corporation founder Richard Swanson.
- Szemerényi's law, in Proto-Indo-European phonology: word-final clusters of vowels (V), resonants (R) and either *s or *h_{2} are simplified by dropping the word-final fricative (*h_{2} was phonetically itself probably a back fricative), with compensatory lengthening of the preceding vowel. Named for Hungarian linguist Oswald Szemerényi.

== T–Z ==
- Taylor's law: a power law in ecology showing the relationship between the variance and mean of species population density. Named for Lionel Roy Taylor.
- Teeter's law: "The language of the family you know best always turns out to be the most archaic." A wry observation about the biases of historical linguists, explaining how different investigators can arrive at radically divergent conceptions of the proto-language of a family. Named after the American linguist Karl V. Teeter.
- Tesler's law of conservation of complexity states that every software application has an inherent amount of complexity that cannot be removed or hidden. Named for Larry Tesler.
- Thirlwall's law: under certain conditions, the long run growth of a country can be approximated by the ratio of the growth of exports to the income elasticity of demand for imports.
- Titius–Bode law: "a hypothesis that the bodies in some orbital systems, including the Sun's, orbit at semi-major axes in a function of planetary sequence". Named for Johann Daniel Titius and Johann Elert Bode.
- Tobler's first law of geography: "Everything is related to everything else, but near things are more related than distant things." Coined by Waldo R. Tobler (1930-2018).
- Tobler's second law of geography: "The phenomenon external to a geographic area of interest affects what goes on inside." Coined by American–Swiss geographer Waldo R. Tobler (1930–2018).
- Toms effect, drag reduction in turbulent flow due to the addition of polymer solvents. Named after B. A. Toms.
- Triffin dilemma, conflict of economic interests that arises between short-term domestic and long-term international objectives for countries whose currency serves as a global reserve currency; named for Belgian American economist Robert Triffin
- Twyman's law: "Any figure that looks interesting or different is usually wrong", following the principle that "the more unusual or interesting the data, the more likely they are to have been the result of an error of one kind or another". A whimsical version of the Sagan standard.
- Van Loon's law: "The amount of mechanical development will always be in inverse ratio to the number of slaves that happen to be at a country's disposal." Named for Hendrik Willem van Loon.
- Vegard's law, in metallurgy, is an approximate empirical rule which holds that a linear relation exists, at constant temperature, between the crystal lattice parameter of an alloy and the concentrations of the constituent elements. Named for Lars Vegard.
- Verdoorn's law, in economics: faster growth in output increases productivity due to increasing returns. Named after Dutch economist Petrus Johannes Verdoorn.
- Verner's law, stated by Karl Verner in 1875, describes a historical sound change in the Proto-Germanic language whereby voiceless fricatives *f, *þ, *s and *x, when immediately following an unstressed syllable in the same word, underwent voicing and became respectively *b, *d, *z and *g.
- Vierordt's law states that, retrospectively, "short" intervals of time tend to be overestimated, and "long" intervals of time tend to be underestimated. Named after German physician Karl von Vierordt.
- Vopěnka's principle, in mathematics, is a large cardinal axiom that states that the set-theoretical universe is so large that in every proper class, some members are similar to others, with this similarity formalized through elementary embeddings. Named after Petr Vopěnka.
- Wagner's law predicts that the development of an industrial economy will be accompanied by an increased share of public expenditure in gross national product, and is named after the German economist Adolph Wagner (1835–1917).
- Walras's law: budget constraints imply that the values of excess market demands must sum to zero.
- Weber–Fechner law, named after the Germans Ernst Heinrich Weber and Gustav Theodor Fechner, attempts to describe the human perception of various physical stimuli. In most cases, Stevens's power law gives a more accurate description.
- Weyl law, in mathematics, describes the asymptotic behavior of eigenvalues of the Laplace-Beltrami operator. Named for Hermann Weyl.
- The Wiedemann–Franz law, in physics, states that the ratio of the electronic contribution of the thermal conductivity (κ) to the electrical conductivity (σ) of a metal is proportional to the temperature (T). Named for Gustav Wiedemann (1826–1899) and Rudolph Franz (1826–1902).
- Wien's displacement law states that the black body radiation curve for different temperatures peaks at a wavelength inversely proportional to the temperature. Named for Wilhelm Wien. (See also Wien approximation.)
- Wiio's laws: The fundamental Wiio's law states that "Communication usually fails, except by accident".
- Wike's law of low odd primes: "If the number of experimental treatments is a low odd prime number, then the experimental design is unbalanced and partially confounded."
- Will Rogers phenomenon is when moving an observation from one group to another increases the average of both groups
- Winter's law: A sound law operating on Balto-Slavic short vowels. Named after Werner Winter
- Wirth's law: Software gets slower more quickly than hardware gets faster.
- Wiswesser's rule gives a simple method to determine the energetic sequence of electron shells. See also Aufbau principle.
- Wolff's law: Bone adapts to pressure, or a lack of it.
- Woodward–Hoffmann rules, in organic chemistry, predict the stereochemistry of pericyclic reactions based on orbital symmetry.
- Wright's law also known as Experience curve effects postulates that as production doubles, the cost of production will decline by a constant percentage. Named after aerospace engineer Theodore Paul Wright (no relation to the Wright brothers) who was working for Curtiss-Wright aircraft during explosive growth in the "Golden Age of Aviation". The law was probably first quantified in the industrial setting sometime in 1936.
- Yao's principle, in computational complexity theory: the expected cost of any randomized algorithm for solving a given problem, on the worst case input for that algorithm, can be no better than the expected cost, for a worst-case random probability distribution on the inputs, of the deterministic algorithm that performs best against that distribution. Named for Andrew Yao.
- Yerkes–Dodson law, an empirical relationship between arousal and performance, originally developed by psychologists Robert M. Yerkes and John Dillingham Dodson.
- Zawinski's law: Every program attempts to expand until it can read mail. Those programs which cannot expand are replaced by ones which can.
- Zeeman effect: Splitting of a spectral line into several components in the presence of a static magnetic field.
- Zipf's law, in linguistics, is the observation that the frequency of use of the nth-most-frequently-used word in any natural language is approximately inversely proportional to n, or, more simply, that a few words are used very often, but many or most are used rarely. Named after George Kingsley Zipf (1902–1950), whose statistical body of research led to the observation. More generally, the term Zipf's law refers to the probability distributions involved, which is applied by statisticians not only to linguistics but also to fields remote from that. See also Zipf–Mandelbrot law.

== See also ==
- Etymology – Study of the origin and evolution of words
- List of eponyms – List of terms created from a person's name
- List of eponymous doctrines
- List of eponymous diseases – Diseases named after a person
- Lists of etymologies
- List of paradoxes – List of statements that appear to contradict themselves
- List of scientific laws named after people
- List of theorems
- Scientific phenomena named after people
