= Akass =

Akass is a surname. Notable people with the surname include:

- Endaddine Akass, character in The Adventures of Tintin
- Jon Akass (1933–1990), British journalist
