= Miller's rule =

Miller's rule or Miller rule may refer to:

- Miller's Rule (optics), an empirical rule which gives an estimate of the order of magnitude of the nonlinear coefficient
- Miller's rules, a set of rules in stellation
- Miller twist rule, a mathematical formula created by Don Miller to calculate the optimum rate of twist for a given bullet traveling through a rifled barrel
- Miller Rule or The Miller test, the United States Supreme Court's test for determining whether speech or expression can be labeled obscene
