= Joy's Law =

Joy's Law can refer to:

- Joy's law (astronomy), relating the distribution of sunspots to their heliographic latitude
- Joy's law (computing), describing peak computer speed as a function of time
- Joy's law (management), on the fact that only some of the smartest people work for your own company
