= Denialism =

Rejecting scientific or historical consensus

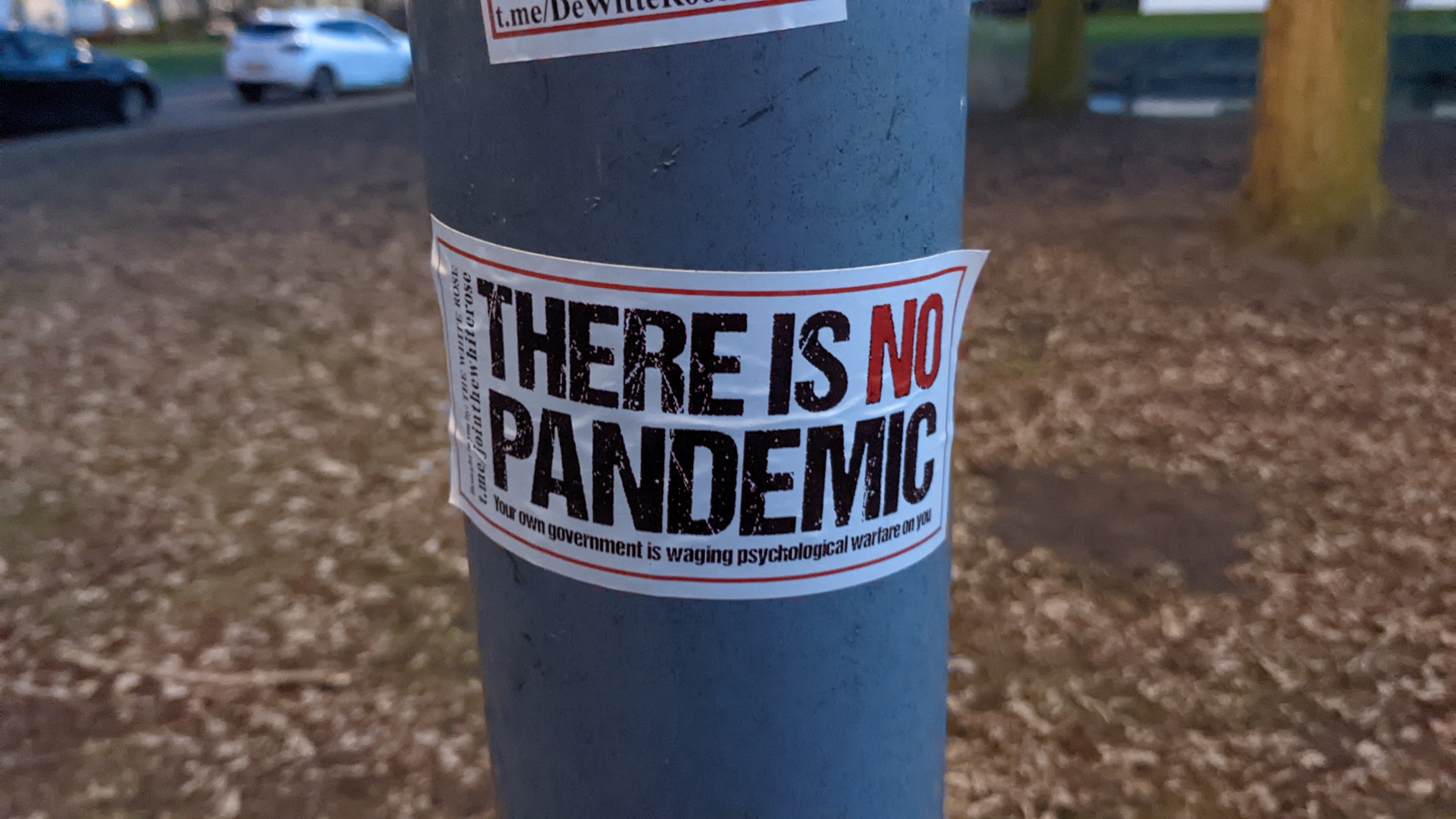
Denialist sticker in the Netherlands, asserting that the COVID-19 pandemic does not exist

In the sciences and in historiography, denialism is the rejection of basic facts and concepts that are undisputed, well-supported parts of the scientific consensus or historical record on a subject, in favor of ideas that are radical, controversial, or fabricated. Examples include Holocaust denial, AIDS denialism, and climate change denial. The forms of denialism present the common feature of the person rejecting overwhelming evidence and trying to generate political controversy in attempts to deny the existence of consensus.

In psychology, denialism is a person's choice to deny reality as a way to avoid believing in an uncomfortable truth. Denialism is an essentially irrational human behavior that withholds the validation of a historical experience or event when a person refuses to accept an empirically verifiable reality.

The motivations and causes of denialism include religion, self-interest (economic, political, or financial), and defence mechanisms meant to protect the psyche of the denialist against mentally disturbing facts and ideas; such disturbance is called cognitive dissonance.

== Definition and tactics ==
Anthropologist Didier Fassin distinguishes between denial, defined as "the empirical observation that reality and truth are being denied", and denialism, which he defines as "an ideological position whereby one systematically reacts by refusing reality and truth". Persons and social groups who reject propositions on which there exists a mainstream and scientific consensus engage in denialism when they use rhetorical tactics to give the appearance of argument and legitimate debate, when there is none. It is a process that operates by employing one or more of the following five tactics to maintain the appearance of legitimate controversy:

1. Conspiracy theories – Dismissing the data or observation by suggesting opponents are involved in "a conspiracy to suppress the truth".
2. Cherry picking – Selecting an anomalous critical paper supporting their idea, or using outdated, flawed, and discredited papers to make their opponents look as though they base their ideas on weak research. Diethelm and McKee (2009) note, "Denialists are usually not deterred by the extreme isolation of their theories, but rather see it as an indication of their intellectual courage against the dominant orthodoxy and the accompanying political correctness."
3. False experts – Paying an expert in the field, or another field, to lend supporting evidence or credibility. This goes hand-in-hand with the marginalization of real experts and researchers.
4. Moving the goalposts – Dismissing evidence presented in response to a specific claim by continually demanding some other (often unfulfillable) piece of evidence (aka Shifting baseline)
5. Other logical fallacies – Usually one or more of false analogy, appeal to consequences, straw man, or red herring.

Common tactics to different types of denialism include misrepresenting evidence, false equivalence, half-truths, and outright fabrication. South African judge Edwin Cameron notes that a common tactic used by denialists is to "make great play of the inescapable indeterminacy of figures and statistics". Historian Taner Akçam states that denialism is commonly believed to be negation of facts, but in fact "it is in that nebulous territory between facts and truth where such denialism germinates. Denialism marshals its own facts and it has its own truth."

Focusing on the rhetorical tactics through which denialism is achieved in language, in Alex Gillespie (2020) of the London School of Economics has reviewed the linguistic and practical defensive tactics for denying disruptive information. These tactics are conceptualized in terms of three layers of defence:

1. Avoiding – The first line of defence against disruptive information is to avoid it.
2. Delegitimizing – The second line of defence is to attack the messenger, by undermining the credibility of the source.
3. Limiting – The final line of defence, if disruptive information cannot be avoided or delegitimized, is to rationalize and limit the impact of the disruptive ideas.

In 2009, author Michael Specter defined group denialism as "when an entire segment of society, often struggling with the trauma of change, turns away from reality in favor of a more comfortable lie".

== Prescriptive and polemic perspectives ==
If one party to a debate accuses the other of denialism they are framing the debate. This is because an accusation of denialism is both prescriptive and polemic: prescriptive because it carries implications that there is truth to the denied claim; polemic since the accuser implies that continued denial in the light of presented evidence raises questions about the other's motives. Edward Skidelsky, a lecturer in philosophy at Exeter University writes that "An accusation of 'denial' is serious, suggesting either deliberate dishonesty or self-deception. The thing being denied is, by implication, so obviously true that the denier must be driven by perversity, malice or wilful blindness." He suggests that, by the introduction of the word denier into further areas of historical and scientific debate, "One of the great achievements of The Enlightenment – the liberation of historical and scientific enquiry from dogma – is quietly being reversed".

Some people have suggested that because denial of the Holocaust is well known, advocates who use the term denialist in other areas of debate may intentionally or unintentionally imply that their opponents are little better than Holocaust deniers. However, Robert Gallo et al. defended this latter comparison, stating that AIDS denialism is similar to Holocaust denial since it is a form of pseudoscience that "contradicts an immense body of research".

== Politics and science ==
=== Climate change ===
Climate misinformation falls within categories such as ● Global warming isn't happening. ● Humans aren't causing global warming. ● Climate impacts aren't bad. ● Climate solutions won't work. ● Climate science is unreliable.

Climate change denial (also global warming denial) is a form of science denial characterized by rejecting, refusing to acknowledge, disputing, or fighting the extensive evidence for anthropogenic global warming that has led to a scientific consensus on climate change. Those promoting denial commonly use rhetorical tactics to give the appearance of a scientific controversy where none exists. Climate change denial includes raising unreasonable doubts about the extent to which climate change is caused by humans, its effects on nature and human society, and understating the costs of climate change adaptation while overstating the costs of mitigating it. To a lesser extent, climate change denial can also be implicit when people accept the science but fail to reconcile it with their belief or action. Several studies have analyzed these positions as forms of denialism, pseudoscience, or propaganda.

Many issues that are settled in the scientific community, such as human responsibility for climate change, remain the subject of politically or economically motivated attempts to downplay, dismiss or deny them—an ideological phenomenon academics and scientists call climate change denial. Climate scientists, especially in the United States, have reported government and oil-industry pressure to censor or suppress their work and hide scientific data, with directives not to discuss the subject publicly. The fossil fuels lobby has been identified as overtly or covertly supporting efforts to undermine or discredit the scientific consensus on climate change.

=== HIV/AIDS ===
AIDS denialism is the denial that the human immunodeficiency virus (HIV) is the cause of acquired immune deficiency syndrome (AIDS). AIDS denialism has been described as being "among the most vocal anti-science denial movements". Some denialists reject the existence of HIV, while others accept that the virus exists but say that it is a harmless passenger virus and not the cause of AIDS. Insofar as denialists acknowledge AIDS as a real disease, they attribute it to some combination of recreational drug use, malnutrition, poor sanitation, and side effects of antiretroviral medication, rather than infection with HIV. However, the evidence that HIV causes AIDS is scientifically conclusive and the scientific community rejects and ignores AIDS-denialist claims as based on faulty reasoning, cherry picking, and misrepresentation of mainly outdated scientific data. (Note: To support their ideas, some AIDS denialists have also misappropriated a scientific review in Nature Medicine which opens with this reasonable statement: "Despite considerable advances in HIV science in the past 20 years, the reason why HIV-1 infection is pathogenic is still debated" (Borowski 2006, p. 369).) With the rejection of these arguments by the scientific community, AIDS-denialist material is now spread mainly through the Internet.

Thabo Mbeki, former president of South Africa, embraced AIDS denialism, proclaiming that AIDS was primarily caused by poverty. About 365,000 people died from AIDS during his presidency; it is estimated that around 343,000 premature deaths could have been prevented if proper treatment had been available.

=== COVID-19 ===
After the December 2020 introduction of COVID vaccines, a partisan gap in death rates developed, indicating the effects of vaccine skepticism. As of March 2024, more than 30 percent of Republicans had not received a Covid vaccine, compared with less than 10 percent of Democrats.

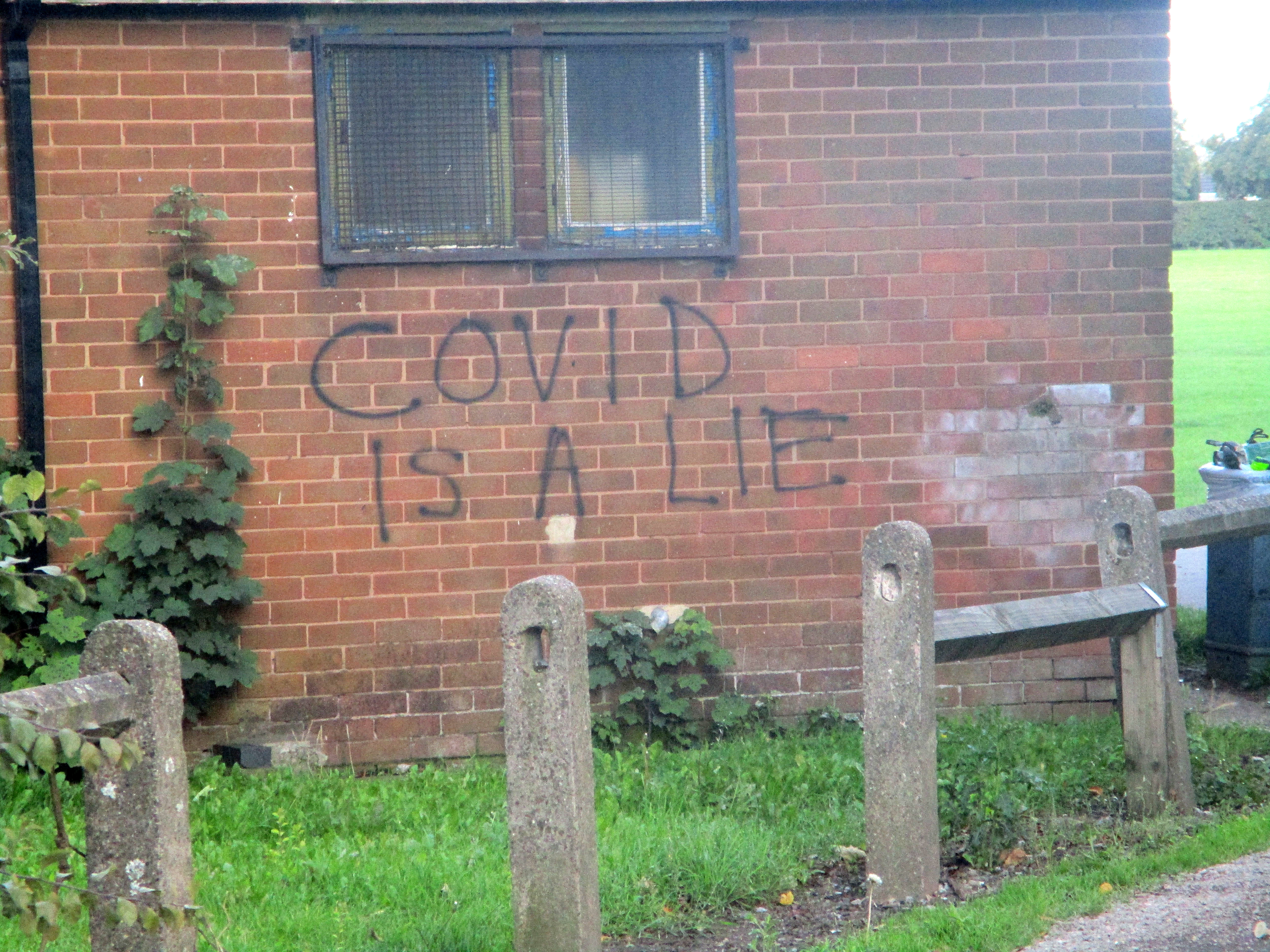
"COVID is a lie" graffiti in Pontefract, West Yorkshire, England

The term "COVID-19 denialism" or merely "COVID denialism" refers to the thinking of those who deny the reality of the COVID-19 pandemic, at least to the extent of denying the scientifically recognized COVID mortality data of the World Health Organization. The claims that the COVID-19 pandemic has been faked, exaggerated, or mischaracterized are pseudoscience. Some famous people who have engaged in COVID-19 denialism include Elon Musk, U.S. President Donald Trump, and former Brazilian President Jair Bolsonaro.

=== Evolution ===
Religious beliefs may prompt an individual to deny the validity of the scientific theory of evolution. Evolution is considered an undisputed fact within the scientific community and in academia, where the level of support for evolution is essentially universal, yet this view is often met with opposition by biblical literalists. The alternative view is often presented as a literal interpretation of the Book of Genesis's creation myth. Many fundamentalist Christians teach creationism as if it were fact under the banners of creation science and intelligent design. Beliefs that typically coincide with creationism include the belief in the global flood myth, geocentrism, and the belief that the Earth is only 6,000–10,000 years old. These beliefs are viewed as pseudoscience in the scientific community and are widely regarded as erroneous.

=== Flat Earth ===
The superseded belief that the Earth is flat, and denial of all of the overwhelming evidence that supports an approximately spherical Earth that rotates around its axis and orbits the Sun, persists into the 21st century. Modern proponents of flat-Earth cosmology (or flat-Earthers) refuse to accept any kind of contrary evidence, dismissing all spaceflights and images from space as hoaxes and accusing all organizations and even private citizens of conspiring to "hide the truth". They also claim that no actual satellites are orbiting the Earth, that the International Space Station is fake, and that these are lies from all governments involved in this grand cover-up. Some even believe other planets and stars are hoaxes.

Adherents of the modern flat-earth model propose that a dome-shaped firmament encloses a disk-shaped Earth. They may also claim, after Samuel Rowbotham, that the Sun is only 3,000 miles (4,800 km) above the Earth and that the Moon and the Sun orbit above the Earth rather than around it. Modern flat-earthers believe that Antarctica is not a continent but a massive ice floe, with a wall 150 feet (46 m) or higher, which circles the perimeter of the Earth and keeps everything (including all the oceans' water) from falling off the edge.

Flat-Earthers also assert that no one is allowed to fly over or explore Antarctica, despite contrary evidence. According to them, all photos and videos of ships sinking under the horizon and of the bottoms of city skylines and clouds below the horizon, revealing the curvature of the Earth, have been manipulated, computer-generated, or somehow faked. Therefore, regardless of any scientific or empirical evidence provided, flat-Earthers conclude that it is fabricated or altered in some way.

When linked to other observed phenomena such as gravity, sunsets, tides, eclipses, distances and other measurements that challenge the flat earth model, claimants replace commonly accepted explanations with piecemeal models that distort or over-simplify how perspective, mass, buoyancy, light or other physical systems work. These piecemeal replacements rarely conform with each other, finally leaving many flat-Earth claimants to agree that such phenomena remain "mysteries" and more investigation is to be done. In this conclusion, adherents remain open to all explanations except the commonly accepted globular Earth model, shifting the debate from ignorance to denialism.

=== Genetically modified foods ===
There is a scientific consensus that currently available food derived from genetically modified crops (GM) poses no greater risk to human health than conventional food, but that each GM food needs to be tested on a case-by-case basis before introduction. Nonetheless, members of the public are much less likely than scientists to perceive GM foods as safe. The legal and regulatory status of GM foods varies by country, with some nations banning or restricting them, and others permitting them with widely differing degrees of regulation.

Psychological analyses indicate that over 70% of GM food opponents in the US are "absolute" in their opposition, experience disgust at the thought of eating GM foods, and are "evidence insensitive".

=== Statins ===
Statin denialism is a rejection of the medical worth of statins, a class of cholesterol-lowering drugs. Cardiologist Steven Nissen at Cleveland Clinic has commented "We are losing the battle for the hearts and minds of our patients to Web sites" promoting unproven medical therapies. Harriet Hall sees a spectrum of statin denialism ranging from pseudoscientific claims to the understatement of benefits and overstatement of side effects, all of which is contrary to the scientific evidence.

=== Mental disorder denial ===
Mental illness denial or mental disorder denial is where a person denies the existence of mental disorders and invisible neurological disorders. Serious analysts, as well as pseudoscientific movements, question the existence of certain disorders. A minority of professional researchers see disorders such as depression from a sociocultural perspective and argue that the solution to it is fixing a dysfunction in society, not in the person's brain. Mental and particularly neurodevelopmental disorders are invisible disabilities, classified as being not immediately apparent. Invisible disabilities can be denied or ignored as they fail to conform to common cultural stereotypes of disability, such as a person in a wheelchair, wearing a prosthesis, or a blind person using a cane. Extreme stereotypes of neurodevelopmental disorders such as autism and schizophrenia are often used to deny the presence of those disorders in higher-functioning individuals. Some people may also deny that they or a family member has a mental disorder after being diagnosed, and certain analysts argue this denialism is usually fueled by narcissistic injury and negative societal views of the disorder. Anti-psychiatry movements such as Scientology promote mental disorder denial by offering alternative practices to psychiatry.

=== Election denial ===
Election denial is baseless rejection of the outcome of a fair election. Since the 2020 United States presidential election, there has been an ongoing narrative asserting that it was fraudulent. Similar events have occurred in different countries: Brazil in 2022 when former president Jair Bolsonaro after his defeat in the 2022 Brazilian general election, questioning the accuracy of the country's electronic voting system. In the 2021 Peruvian general election, presidential candidate Keiko Fujimori alleged fraud and irregularities in the voting count which were disproved by election authorities and international observers.

== Historiography ==
Historical negationism, the denialism of widely accepted historical facts, is a major source of concern among historians and it is frequently used to falsify or distort accepted historical events. In attempting to revise the past, negationists are distinguished by the use of techniques inadmissible in proper historical discourse, such as presenting known forged documents as genuine, inventing ingenious but implausible reasons for distrusting genuine documents, attributing conclusions to books and sources that report the opposite, manipulating statistical series to support the given point of view, and deliberately mistranslating texts.

Some countries, such as Germany, have criminalized the negationist revision of certain historical events, while other countries take a more cautious position for various reasons, such as the protection of free speech. Others mandate negationist views, such as California, where schoolchildren have, in the past, been explicitly prevented from learning about the California genocide.

=== Armenian genocide denialism ===
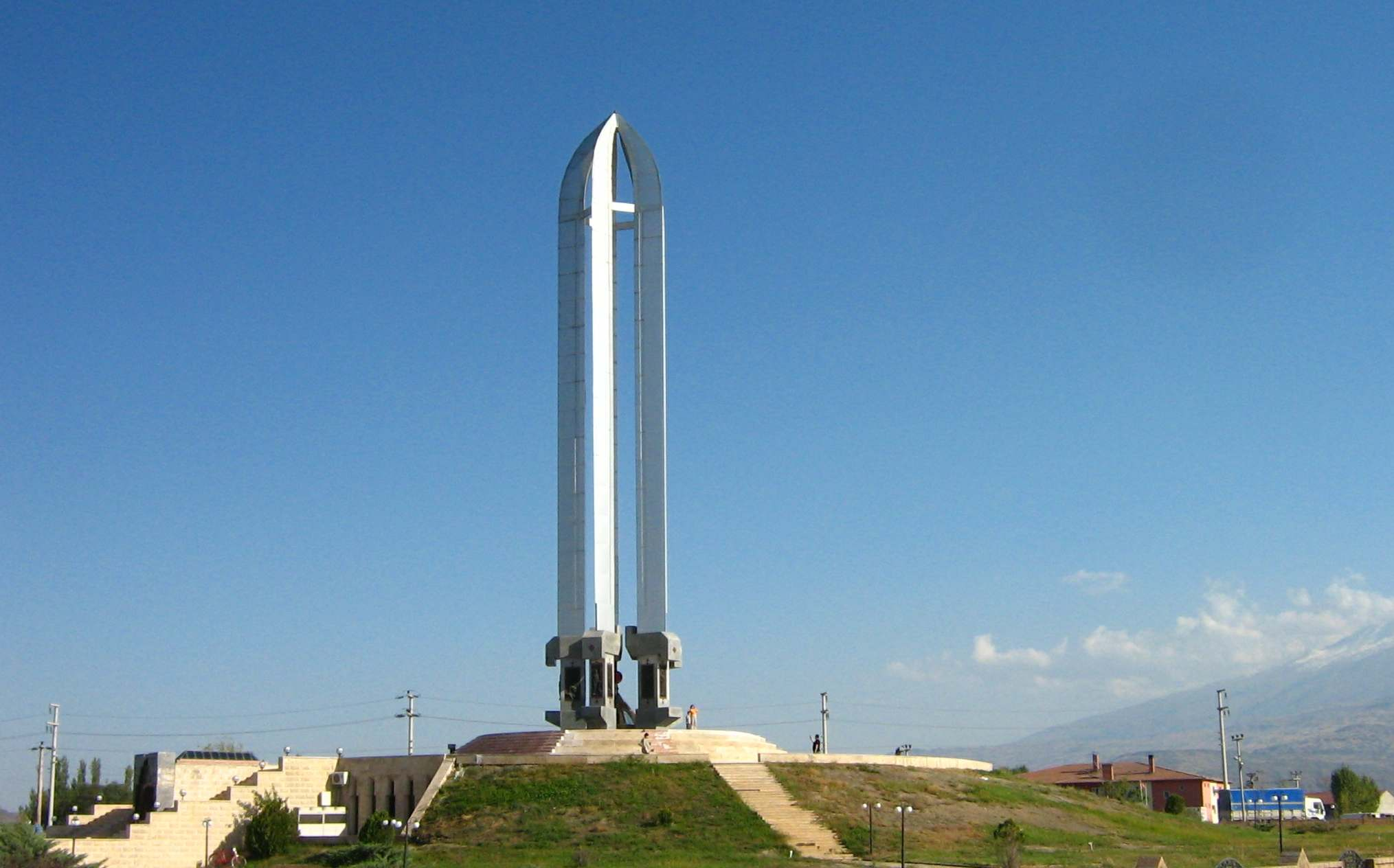
The Iğdır Genocide Memorial and Museum promotes the false view that Armenians committed genocide against Turks, rather than vice versa.

Armenian genocide denial is the negationist claim that the Ottoman Empire and its ruling party, the Committee of Union and Progress (CUP), did not commit genocide against its Armenian citizens during World War I—a crime documented in a large body of evidence and affirmed by the vast majority of scholars. The perpetrators denied the genocide as they carried it out, claiming that Armenians in the Ottoman Empire were resettled for military reasons, not exterminated. In its aftermath, incriminating documents were systematically destroyed. Since the 1920s, denial has been the policy of every government of the Ottoman Empire's successor state, the Republic of Turkey.

Borrowing arguments used by the CUP to justify its actions, Armenian genocide denial rests on the notion that the deportation of Armenians was a legitimate state action in response to an alleged Armenian uprising that threatened the empire's existence during wartime. Deniers assert that the CUP intended to resettle Armenians, not kill them. They claim the death toll is exaggerated or attribute the deaths to other factors, such as a purported civil war, disease, bad weather, rogue local officials, or bands of Kurds and outlaws. The historian Ronald Grigor Suny summarizes the main argument as: "There was no genocide, and the Armenians were to blame for it."

A critical reason for denial is that the genocide enabled the establishment of a Turkish nation-state; recognizing it would contradict Turkey's founding myths. Since the 1920s, Turkey has worked to prevent recognition or even mention of the genocide in other countries. It has spent millions of dollars on lobbying, created research institutes, and used intimidation and threats. Denial, according to Donald Bloxham, is usually accompanied by "rhetoric of Armenian treachery, aggression, criminality, and territorial ambition". Denial affects Turkey's domestic policies and is taught in Turkish schools; some Turkish citizens who recognize the genocide have faced prosecution for "insulting Turkishness". Turkey's century-long effort to deny the genocide sets it apart from other historical cases of genocide.

Azerbaijan, a close ally of Turkey, also denies the genocide and campaigns against its recognition internationally. Most Turkish citizens and political parties support Turkey's denial policy. Scholars argue that Armenian genocide denial has set the tone for the government's attitude towards minorities, and has contributed to the ongoing violence against Kurds in Turkey. A 2014 poll of 1,500 people conducted by EDAM, a Turkish think tank, found that nine percent of Turkish citizens recognize the genocide.

=== Holocaust denialism ===
Holocaust denial refers to the denial of the murder of 5 to 6 million Jews by the Nazis in Europe during World War 2. In this context, the term is a subset of genocide denial, which is a form of politically motivated denialism.

=== Nakba denialism ===
Nakba denial refers to attempts to downgrade, deny and misdescribe the ethnic cleansing of Palestinians during the Nakba, in which four-fifths of all Palestinians were driven off their lands and into exile.

=== Srebrenica massacre denialism ===
Sonja Biserko, president of the Helsinki Committee for Human Rights in Serbia, and Edina Bečirević, the Faculty of Criminalistics, Criminology and Security Studies of the University of Sarajevo have pointed to a culture of denial of the Srebrenica massacre in Serbian society, taking many forms and present in particular in political discourse, the media, the law and the educational system.

== See also ==
- Agnotology
- Anti-environmentalism
- Barriers to pro-environmental behaviour
- Confirmation bias – Bias confirming existing attitudes
- Cult – Social group with unusual beliefs and rituals
- Delusion – Fixation of holding false beliefs
- Environmental skepticism – Skepticism of environmentalism
- Euphemism – Mild or indirect word or expression
- Gibson's law – Every PhD has an equal and opposite PhD
- Inoculation theory – How people's attitudes can resist change through weak counterargument exposures
- List of cognitive biases
- Myth of the flat Earth
- Obscurantism – Practice of obscuring information
- Philosophy of science – Branch of philosophy
- Pseudoskepticism – Position that appears to be skeptic but is actually dogmatic
- Psychology of climate change denial
- Red pill and blue pill – Metaphor for a choice of truth or illusion
- Reputation management – Marketing technique
- Voldemort effect
