= Verdoorn's law =

Economic relationship between growth in output and growth in productivity

Verdoorn's law is named after Dutch economist Petrus Johannes Verdoorn. It states that in the long run productivity generally grows proportionally to the square root of output. In economics, this law pertains to the relationship between the growth of output and the growth of productivity. According to the law, faster growth in output increases productivity due to increasing returns. Verdoorn argued that "in the long run a change in the volume of production, say about 10 per cent, tends to be associated with an average increase in labor productivity of 4.5 per cent." The Verdoorn coefficient close to 0.5 (0.484) is also found in subsequent estimations of the law.

== Description ==
Verdoorn's law describes a simple long-run relation between productivity and output growth, whose coefficients were empirically estimated in 1949 by the Dutch economist. The relation takes the following form: $p=a+ bQ$

where p is the labor productivity growth, Q the output growth (value-added), b is the Verdoorn coefficient and a is the exogenous productivity growth rate.

Verdoorn's law differs from "the usual hypothesis […] that the growth of productivity is mainly to be explained by the progress of knowledge in science and technology", as it typically is in neoclassical models of growth (notably the Solow model). Verdoorn's law is usually associated with cumulative causation models of growth, in which demand rather than supply determine the pace of accumulation.

Nicholas Kaldor and Anthony Thirlwall developed models of export-led growth based on Verdoorn's law. For a given country an expansion of the export sector may cause specialisation in the production of export products, which increase the productivity level, and increase the level of skills in the export sector. This may then lead to a reallocation of resources from the less efficient non-trade sector to the more productive export sector, lower prices for traded goods and higher competitiveness. This productivity change may then lead expanded exports and to output growth.

Thirlwall shows that for several countries the rate of growth never exceeds the ratio of the rate of growth of exports to income elasticity of demand for imports. This implies that growth is limited by the balance of payments equilibrium. This result is known as Thirlwall's Law.

Sometimes Verdoorn's law is called Kaldor-Verdoorn's law or effect.
