= Claasen's law =

Law of technology usefulness

Claasen's logarithmic law of usefulness is named after technologist Theo A. C. M. Claasen, who introduced the idea in 1999 when he was CTO of Philips Semiconductors:

Usefulness = log(Technology)

The law can also be expressed as:

Technology = exp(Usefulness)

== Examples ==
System parameters (e.g. RAM, CPU speed, disk capacity) need to increase by a multiple to create a noticeable impact on performance. In the case of RAM, by the law, a 256MB unit is only ^{1}/_{8} more practically useful than a 128MB unit though the base unit has doubled. It would require a 16384MB (128 × 128MB) unit of RAM to truly double performance under the law.

A modern car (e.g. a Ford Mondeo) is not substantially more useful at getting the occupants from A to B than an older car (e.g. a Ford Model T)

== Relation to Moore's law ==
In order to achieve a linear improvement in usefulness over time it is necessary to have an exponential increase in technology over time. Moore's law delivers an exponential increase in technology, and so when Claasen's law is combined with Moore's law it implies a linear improvement in usefulness over time.

== See also ==
- List of eponymous laws
