= Jon Akass =

British journalist (1933–1990)

- Born: 16 July 1933; Bedford, England
- Died: 4 June 1990 (aged 56); London, England
- Education: Bedford Modern School
- Known for: Columnist
- Spouse: Peggy
- Children: 4

John Ewart Akass (16 July 1933 – 4 June 1990), known as Jon Akass, was a British Fleet Street journalist. He entered Fleet Street as a journalist on the Daily Herald (which later became The Sun). The last years of his career were spent at the Daily Express following a brief period at Sir James Goldsmith's NOW! in 1981. Akass was named British columnist of the year in 1976.

== Life ==
Akass was born in Bedford, England, and educated at Bedford Modern School between 1944 and 1949.

After National Service with the RAF, Akass joined the London office of the Glasgow Herald as a teaboy. He worked as a reporter on a local newspaper in Lincolnshire before joining the Daily Herald in Manchester, where he was responsible for the coverage of the Munich air disaster which claimed eight players of the Manchester United football team in 1958. He soon moved to the London offices of the Daily Herald where he worked alongside Dennis Potter and was given a regular column at the age of 24.

Akass stayed with The Sun, as the Daily Herald became, and continued with the paper when it was acquired by Rupert Murdoch in 1969 and underwent its transformation into a tabloid. Akass was named British columnist of the year in 1976. As a columnist, he joined the staff of Sir James Goldsmith's NOW! in 1981, two days before Goldsmith closed the magazine. He returned to his previous post, but was a columnist of the Daily Express in his last years. He was a personal friend of Michael Parkinson.

Akass died from cancer in London on 4 June 1990, aged 56, and was survived by his wife, Peggy, and four children. His memorial service was held at St Bride's Church, Fleet Street, where Canon John Oates officiated. Readings were given by his son, Mark Akass, and Nicholas Lloyd. Akass was a convivial journalist and over one hundred people attended the service including Michael Parkinson, Eve Pollard and Anne Robinson. Anne Robinson's then husband, John Penrose, read an address as did George Gale remarking that "John is up there drinking gin with the angels".

An obituary by Keith Waterhouse in The Guardian described him as a "shambling Ustinov-shaped figure in a crumpled white suit" who "forever looked either as if he was on his way to a good nap after a good lunch or as if he had just risen from a good nap in time for the cocktail hour and a good supper."
