= Premack's principle =

Theory of reinforcement learning

The Premack principle, or the relativity theory of reinforcement, states that more probable behaviors will reinforce less probable behaviors.

== Origin and description ==
The Premack principle was derived from a study of Cebus monkeys by David Premack. It was found that parameters can be understood in which the monkey operates. However, it has explanatory and predictive power when applied to humans, and it has been used by therapists practicing applied behavior analysis. The Premack principle suggests that if a person wants to perform a given activity, the person will perform a less desirable activity to get at the more desirable activity; that is, activities may themselves be reinforcers. An individual will be more motivated to perform a particular activity if they know that they will partake in a more desirable activity as a consequence. Stated objectively, if high-probability behaviors (more desirable behaviors) are made contingent upon lower-probability behaviors (less desirable behaviors), then the lower-probability behaviors are more likely to occur. More desirable behaviors are those that individuals spend more time doing if permitted; less desirable behaviors are those that individuals spend less time doing when free to act. Just as "reward" was commonly used to alter behavior long before "reinforcement" was studied experimentally, the Premack principle has long been informally understood and used in a wide variety of circumstances. An example is a mother who says, "You have to finish your vegetables (low frequency) before you can eat any ice cream (high frequency)."

== Experimental evidence ==
David Premack and his colleagues, and others have conducted several experiments to test the effectiveness of the Premack principle in humans. One of the earliest studies was conducted with young children. Premack gave the children two response alternatives, eating candy or playing a pinball machine, and determined which of these behaviors was more probable for each child. Some of the children preferred one activity, some the other. In the second phase of the experiment, the children were tested with one of two procedures. In one procedure, eating was the reinforcing response, and playing pinball served as the instrumental response; that is, the children had to play pinball to eat candy. The results were consistent with the Premack principle: only the children who preferred eating candy over playing pinball showed a reinforcement effect. The roles of responses were reversed in the second test, with corresponding results. That is, only children who preferred playing pinball over eating candy showed a reinforcement effect. This study, among others, helps to confirm the Premack principle in showing that a high-probability activity can be an effective reinforcer for an activity that the subject is less likely to perform.

== An alternative: response deprivation theory ==
The Premack principle may be violated if a situation or schedule of reinforcement provides much more of the high-probability behavior than of the low-probability behavior. Such observations led the team of Timberlake and Allison (1974) to propose the response deprivation hypothesis. Like the Premack principle, this hypothesis bases reinforcement of one behavior on access to another. Experimenters observe the extent to which an individual is deprived of or prevented from performing the behavior that is later made contingent on the second behavior. Reinforcement occurs only when the situation is set up so that access to the contingent response has been reduced relative to its baseline level. In effect, the subject must subsequently increase responding to make up for the "deprivation" of the contingent response. Several subsequent experiments have supported this alternative to the Premack principle.

== Application to applied behavior analysis ==
In applied behavior analysis, the Premack principle is sometimes known as "grandma's rule", which states that making the opportunity to engage in high-frequency behavior contingent upon the occurrence of low-frequency behavior will function as a reinforcer for the low-frequency behavior. In other words, an individual must "first" engage in the desired target behavior, "then" they get to engage something reinforcing in return. For example, to encourage a child who prefers chocolate candy to eat vegetables (low-frequency behavior), the behaviorist would want to make access to eating chocolate candy (high-frequency behavior) contingent upon consuming the vegetables (low-frequency behavior). In this example, the statement would be, "first eat all of your vegetables; then you can have one chocolate candy." This statement or "rule" serves to make a highly probable behavior or preferred event used contingently to strengthen a low likely or non-preferred event. Its applications are seen in many different settings, from early intervention services, at home, to educational systems.

== See also ==
- List of eponymous laws
