= Gibson's law =

Every PhD has an equal and opposite PhD

In public relations, and in the practice of law, Gibson's law holds that "For every PhD there is an equal and opposite PhD." The term specifically refers to the conflict between testimony of expert witnesses called by opposing parties in a trial under an adversarial system of justice. It is also applied to conflicting scientific opinion injected into policy decisions by interested parties creating a controversy to promote their interests.

An early mention of "Gibson's Rule" comes from Ivan Preston who wrote "The problem of having opposing sides present opposite pictures of the consumer and of the research process was nicely distilled in a statement made by Fletcher Waller while representing General Mills in the children’s rulemaking. Waller quoted what he called Gibson’s Rule, which is that for every Ph.D. there is an equal and opposite Ph.D."

== See also ==
- Academic bias – Bias of scholars allowing their beliefs to shape their research
- Clarke's three laws – Axioms proposed by British science fiction writer Arthur C. Clarke
- List of eponymous laws – Adages and sayings named after a person
- Newton's laws of motion § Third law
- Politicization of science – Use of science for political purposes
