= Archie's law =

Relationship between the electrical conductivity of a rock and its porosity

In petrophysics, Archie's law is a purely empirical law relating the measured electrical conductivity of a porous rock to its porosity and fluid saturation. It is named after Gus Archie (1907–1978) and laid the foundation for modern well log interpretation, as it relates borehole electrical conductivity measurements to hydrocarbon saturations.

== Statement of the law ==
The in-situ electrical conductivity ($C_t$) of a fluid-saturated, porous rock is described as

$$C_t = \frac{1}{a} C_w \phi^m S_w^n$$

where

- $\phi\,\!$ denotes the porosity
- $C_w$ represents the electrical conductivity of the aqueous solution (fluid or liquid phase)
- $S_w$ is the water saturation, or more generally the fluid saturation, of the pores
- $m$ is the cementation exponent of the rock (usually in the range 1.8–2.0 for sandstones)
- $n$ is the saturation exponent (usually close to 2)
- $a$ is the tortuosity factor.

This relationship attempts to describe ion flow (mostly sodium and chloride) in clean, consolidated sands, with varying intergranular porosity. Electrical conduction is assumed to be exclusively performed by ions dissolved in the pore-filling fluid. Electrical conduction is considered to be absent in the rock grains of the solid phase or in organic fluids other than water (oil, hydrocarbon, gas).

=== Reformulated for resistivity measurements ===
The electrical resistivity, the inverse of the electrical conductivity $(R = \frac{1}{C})$, is expressed as

$$R_t = a R_w \phi^{-m} S_w^{-n}$$

with $R_t$ for the total fluid saturated rock resistivity, and $R_w$ for the resistivity of the fluid itself (w meaning water or an aqueous solution containing dissolved salts with ions bearing electricity in solution).

The factor

$$F = \frac{a}{\phi^m} = \frac{R_t}{R_w}$$

is also called the formation factor, where $R_t$ (index $t$ standing for total) is the resistivity of the rock saturated with the fluid and $R_w$ is the resistivity of the fluid (index $w$ standing for water) inside the porosity of the rock. The porosity being saturated with the fluid (often water, $w$), $S_w^{-n} = 1$.

In case the fluid filling the porosity is a mixture of water and hydrocarbon (petroleum, oil, gas), a resistivity index ($I$) can be defined:

$$I = \frac{R_t}{R_o} = S_w^{-n}$$

Where $R_o$ is the resistivity of the rock saturated in water only.

== Parameters ==
=== Cementation exponent, m ===
The cementation exponent models how much the pore network increases the resistivity, as the rock itself is assumed to be non-conductive. If the pore network were to be modelled as a set of parallel capillary tubes, a cross-sectional area average of the rock's resistivity would yield a porosity dependence equivalent to a cementation exponent of 1. However, the tortuosity of the rock increases this to a higher number than 1. This relates the cementation exponent to the permeability of the rock; increasing permeability decreases the cementation exponent.

The exponent $m$ has been observed near 1.3 for unconsolidated sands, and is believed to increase with cementation. Typical values for this cementation exponent for consolidated sandstones are 1.8 < $m$ < 2.0. In carbonate rocks, the cementation exponent shows higher variance due to strong diagenetic affinity and complex pore structures. Values between 1.7 and 4.1 have been observed.

The cementation exponent is usually assumed not to be dependent on temperature.

=== Saturation exponent, n ===
The saturation exponent $n$ usually is fixed to values close to 2. The saturation exponent models the dependency on the presence of non-conductive fluid (hydrocarbons) in the pore-space, and is related to the wettability of the rock. Water-wet rocks, for low water saturation values, will maintain a continuous film along the pore walls, making the rock conductive. Oil-wet rocks will have discontinuous droplets of water within the pore space, making the rock less conductive.

=== Tortuosity factor, a ===
The constant $a$, called the tortuosity factor, cementation intercept, lithology factor or, lithology coefficient is sometimes used. It is meant to correct for variation in compaction, pore structure and grain size. The parameter $a$ is called the tortuosity factor and is related to the path length of the current flow. The value lies within the range of 0.5 to 1.5, and it may vary across different reservoirs. However, a typical value to start with for a sandstone reservoir might be 0.6, which can then be tuned during the log data matching process using other sources of data, such as core.

=== Measuring the exponents ===
In petrophysics, the only reliable source for the numerical value of both exponents is experiments on sand plugs from cored wells. The fluid electrical conductivity can be measured directly on samples of produced fluid (groundwater). Alternatively, the fluid electrical conductivity and the cementation exponent can also be inferred from downhole electrical conductivity measurements across fluid-saturated intervals. For fluid-saturated intervals ($S_w=1$) Archie's law can be written

$$\log{C_t} = \log{C_w} + m \log{\phi}\,\!$$

Hence, plotting the logarithm of the measured in-situ electrical conductivity against the logarithm of the measured in-situ porosity (Pickett plot), according to Archie's law, a straight-line relationship is expected with slope equal to the cementation exponent $m$ and intercept equal to the logarithm of the in-situ fluid electrical conductivity.

== Sands with clay/shaly sands ==
Archie's law postulates that the rock matrix is non-conductive. For sandstone with clay minerals, this assumption is no longer true in general, due to the clay's structure and cation exchange capacity. The Waxman–Smits equation is one model that tries to correct for this.

== See also ==
- Birch's law
- Byerlee's law
- List of eponymous laws
