= Niven's laws =

Author Larry Niven's rules about how the universe works

Niven's laws were named after science fiction author Larry Niven, who has periodically published them as "how the Universe works" as far as he can tell. These were most recently rewritten on January 29, 2002 (and published in Analog magazine in the November 2002 issue). Among the rules are:

- Never fire a laser at a mirror.
- Giving up freedom for security is beginning to look naïve. (This one is based on a quote - "Those who would give up essential Liberty, to purchase a little temporary Safety, deserve neither Liberty nor Safety," from Benjamin Franklin.)
- It is easier to destroy than to create.
- Ethics change with technology.
- The only universal message in science fiction: There exist minds that think as well as you do, but differently.

== Others ==
=== Niven's Law (Time travel) ===
A different law is given this name in Niven's essay "The Theory and Practice of Time Travel":

If the universe of discourse permits the possibility of time travel and of changing the past, then no time machine will be invented in that universe.

Hans Moravec glosses this version of Niven's Law as follows:

There is a spookier possibility: Suppose it is easy to send messages to the past, but that forward causality also holds (i.e. past events determine the future). In one way of reasoning about it, a message sent to the past will "alter" the entire history following its receipt, including the event that sent it, and thus the message itself. Thus altered, the message will change the past in a different way, and so on, until some "equilibrium" is reached – the simplest being the situation where no message at all is sent. Time travel may thus act to erase itself (an idea Larry Niven fans will recognize as "Niven's Law").

Ryan North examines this law in Dinosaur Comics #1818.

This proposition is also extensively examined in James P. Hogan's Thrice Upon a Time.

=== Niven's Law (re: Clarke's Third Law) ===
Niven's Law is also a term given to the converse of Clarke's third law, so Niven's Law reads: "Any sufficiently advanced magic is indistinguishable from technology." However, it has also been credited as being from Terry Pratchett. Keystone Folklore identifies it as a "fan-composed corollary slogan" of Arthur C. Clarke fans. Gregory Benford in his January 30, 2013 "Variations on Clarke's Third Law" identifies it as a corollary to Clarke’s third law,

Both Clarke's Third Law and Niven's Law are referenced in the extended edition of the 1989 serial Battlefield from season 26 of Doctor Who. In this episode, the Doctor and his companion Ace have entered a trans-dimensional spaceship. While discussing the ship itself, the Doctor asks his companion if she knows Clarke's Law, which she then recites: "Any advanced form of technology is indistinguishable from magic." The Doctor replies that the reverse is true and Ace voices this, working through the inverse, "any advanced form of magic is indistinguishable from technology."

=== Niven's Laws (stories) ===
Niven's Laws is also the title of a 1984 collection of Niven's short stories.

Included in the 1989 collection N-Space are six laws titled Niven's Laws for Writers. They are:

1. Writers who write for other writers should write letters.
2. Never be embarrassed or ashamed about anything you choose to write. (Think of this before you send it to a market.)
3. Stories to end all stories on a given topic, don't.
4. It is a sin to waste the reader's time.
5. If you've nothing to say, say it any way you like. Stylistic innovations, contorted story lines or none, exotic or genderless pronouns, internal inconsistencies, the recipe for preparing your lover as a cannibal banquet: feel free. If what you have to say is important and/or difficult to follow, use the simplest language possible. If the reader doesn't get it, then let it not be your fault.
6. Everybody talks first draft.

In the acknowledgments of his 2003 novel Conquistador, S.M. Stirling wrote:

And a special acknowledgment to the author of Niven's Law: "There is a technical, literary term for those who mistake the opinions and beliefs of characters in a novel for those of the author. The term is 'idiot'."

=== Niven's Laws (from Known Space) ===
Drawn from Known Space: The Future Worlds of Larry Niven

  1. Never throw shit at an armed man.
  2. Never stand next to someone who is throwing shit at an armed man.
1. Never fire a laser at a mirror.
2. Mother Nature doesn't care if you're having fun.
3. $F \times S = k ~.$ The product of Freedom and Security is a constant. To gain more freedom of thought and/or action, you must give up some security, and vice versa.
4. Psi and/or magical powers, if real, are nearly useless.
5. It is easier to destroy than create.
6. Any damn fool can predict the past.
7. History never repeats itself.
8. Ethics change with technology.
9. There ain't no justice. (often abbreviated to TANJ)
10. Anarchy is the least stable of social structures. It falls apart at a touch.
11. There is a time and place for tact. And there are times when tact is entirely misplaced.
12. The ways of being human are bounded but infinite.
13. The world's dullest subjects, in order:
  1. Somebody else's diet.
  2. How to make money for a worthy cause.
  3. Special Interest Liberation.
14. The only universal message in science fiction: There exist minds that think as well as you do, but differently.
  Niven's corollary: The gene-tampered turkey you're talking to isn't necessarily one of them.
15. Fuzzy Pink Niven's Law: Never waste calories (i.e., don't eat food just because it's available, or cheap; only eat food you'll enjoy, because you have to limit overall calorie intake).
16. There is no cause so right that one cannot find a fool following it.
  in variant form in Fallen Angels as "Niven's Law: No cause is so noble that it won't attract fuggheads."
17. No technique works if it isn't used.
18. Not responsible for advice not taken.
19. Old age is not for sissies.

In November 2002 the above list was published to Analog Magazine but with slightly different numbering and new commentary. "The world's dullest subjects" entry was removed, and a new final entry "Never let a waiter escape." was added to the end.

== See also ==
- Asimov's Three Laws of Robotics – Fictional set of rules by Isaac Asimov
- Foundation (novel series) – Science-fiction novel series by Isaac Asimov
- Clarke's three laws – Axioms proposed by British science fiction writer Arthur C. Clarke
- First contact (anthropology) – First meeting of two cultures previously unaware of one another
- Futures studies – Study of postulating possible futures
- List of eponymous laws – Adages and sayings named after a person
- Search for extraterrestrial intelligence – Effort to find civilizations not from Earth
