= Hutber's law =

Adage that "improvement means deterioration"

Hutber's law states that "improvement means deterioration". It is founded on the cynical observation that a stated improvement actually hides a deterioration.

The term has seen wide application in business, engineering, and risk analysis. It was invented in the 1970s by Patrick Hutber, an economist and journalist who was the City Editor for The Sunday Telegraph in London from 1966 to 1979.

His view was that if a company tells you it is 'improving' the service it provides, it almost always means that it will be doing less for you, or charging you more, or both.

== See also ==
- Law (principle)
- List of eponymous laws
- Newspeak
- Parkinson's law
- Unintended consequence
