= Philip LeSourd =

American linguist

Philip S. LeSourd is a linguist and an anthropology professor at Indiana University in the United States. He is one of the world's foremost experts on the Maliseet-Passamaquoddy language and the Algonquian language family.

LeSourd earned both a bachelor's degree and a Ph.D. in linguistics at MIT. He became fascinated with Algonquian languages after a class in the Fox language from Ives Goddard at Harvard soon after finishing his bachelor's degree. At the instigation of Karl Teeter and later Ken Hale, he spent time residing among the Maliseet and Passamaquoddy communities in Maine, United States, and New Brunswick, Canada. He studied the language both academically, with expert Robert Leavitt of the Mi'kmaq - Maliseet Institute at the University of New Brunswick, and through study with a variety of native speakers. LeSourd, Leavitt, and native Passamaquoddy speaker David Francis, Sr. launched a Maliseet-Passamaquoddy to English dictionary project, which resulted in a published dictionary entitled Kolusuwakonol, about eight years after the project began. The project has continued since, including with funding by Industry Canada and the National Science Foundation, and has been made available online.

LeSourd has continued actively to research Maliseet-Passamaquoddy and a variety of other Algonquian languages.
