= Patrick Hutber =

British journalist

Patrick Hutber (18 May 1928 – 3 January 1980) was a British journalist.

He was educated at Ealing Grammar School for Boys and New College, Oxford, where he was librarian and secretary of the Union in 1951. After working for J. Lyons and Co. and the Institute of Bankers, in 1957 he was employed by the Financial Times. He became its commercial editor in 1959 and in 1964 he started the Questor column of The Daily Telegraph. Hutber was appointed City Editor of The Sunday Telegraph in 1966 and afterwards became associate editor and economic commentator of Now! He was awarded the Financial Journalist of the Year Award in 1972.

His maxim Hutber's Law ('Improvement means deterioration') is still regularly cited.

== Works ==
- The Decline and Fall of the Middle Class and How It Can Fight Back (1976).
- (editor) What is Wrong with Britain? (1978).
