= Birch's law =

Relation between density of rock and compressional wave velocity

Birch's law, discovered by the geophysicist Francis Birch, establishes a linear relation between compressional wave velocity $v_\mathrm p$ and density $\rho$ of rocks and minerals:

$$v_\mathrm{p} = a( \bar M ) + b \rho$$

where $\, \bar M \,$ is the mean atomic mass in formula units and $\, a(x) \,$ is an empirical function determined by experiment.

== Example ==
The mean atomic mass of forsterite (Mg_{2}SiO_{4}) is equal to the sum of the atomic masses divided by the number of atoms in the formula:

$$\bar{M} = \frac{ 2 \times (24.3) \;+\; 1 \times (28.3) \;+\; 4 \times (16.0) }{ 2 \qquad \;+\; \qquad 1 \qquad \,+\; \qquad 4 } = 20.13$$

Typical oxides and silicates in the mantle have values close to 20, while in the Earth's core it is close to 50.

== Applications ==
Birch's law applies to rocks that are under pressures of a few tens of gigapascals, enough for most cracks to close. It can be used in the discussion of geophysical data. The law is used in forming compositional and mineralogical models of the mantle by using the change in the velocity of the seismic wave and its relationship with a change in density of the material the wave is moving in. Birch's law is used in determining chemical similarities in the mantle as well as the discontinuities of the transition zones. Birch's Law can also be employed in the calculation of an increase of velocity due to an increase in the density of material.

== Shortcomings ==
It had been previously assumed that the velocity-density relationship is constant. That is, that Birch's law will hold true in any case, but the relationship does not hold true deeper in the mantle for the increased pressures near the transition zone. In cases where Birch's law was applied beyond the transition zone, parts of the formula need to be revised. For higher pressure regimes, different laws may be needed to determine wave velocities.

== Determining Birch's law experimentally ==
The relationship between the density of a material and the velocity of a P wave moving through the material was noted when research was conducted on waves in different materials.

In the experiment, a pulse of voltage is applied to a circular plate of polarized barium titanate ceramic (the transducer) which is attached to the near end of the material sample. The added voltage creates vibrations in the sample. Those vibrations travel through the sample to a second transducer on the far end. The vibrations are then converted into an electrical wave which is viewed on an oscilloscope to determine the travel time. The velocity is the lender of the damper decided by the wave's travel time.

The resulting relationship between the density of the material and the discovered velocity is known as Birch's law.

== Velocity of compressional waves in rocks ==
The table shows the velocities for different rocks ranging in pressure from 10 bars to 10,000 bars. It represents how the change in density, as given in the second column, is related to the velocity of the P wave moving in the material. An increase in the density of the material leads to an increase in the velocity which can be determined using Birch's Law.

Velocities of Compressional Waves in Rocks
Rock Type	Rock Location	Rock Density	Wave Velocity (in km/s) at Pressure:			
Rock Type	Rock Location	Rock Density	10 bar	500 bar	2000 bar	10,000 bar
Serpentinite	Thetford, Quebec	2.601	5.6	—	5.73	6.00
Serpentinite	Ludlow, VT	2.614	4.7	6.33	6.59	6.82
Granite, “G.I.”	Westerly, RI	2.619	4.1	5.63	5.97	6.23
Granite	Quincy, MA	2.621	5.1	6.04	6.20	6.45
Granite	Rockport, MA	2.624	5.0	5.96	6.29	6.51
Granite	Stone Mt., GA	2.625	3.7	5.42	6.16	6.40
Granite	Chelmsford, MA	2.626	4.2	5.64	6.09	6.35
Gneiss	Pelham, MA	2.643	3.4	5.67	6.06	6.31
Quartz monzonite	Porterville, CA	2.644	5.1	—	6.07	6.37
Quartzite	MT	2.647	5.6	—	6.15	6.35
Granite	Hyderabad, India	2.654	5.4	6.26	6.38	6.56
Granite	Barre, VT	2.655	5.1	5.86	6.15	6.39
Sandstone	NY	2.659	3.9	5.0	5.44	5.85
Pyrophyllite granite	Sacred; Heart, MN	2.662	5.9	—	6.28	6.45
Granite	Barriefield, Ontario	2.672	5.7	6.21	6.35	6.51
Gneiss	Hell Gate, NY	2.675	5.1	6.06	6.23	6.50
Granite	Hyderabad, India	2.676	5.7	—	6.46	6.61
“Granite”	Englehart, Ontario	2.679	6.1	6.28	6.37	6.57
Greywacke	New Zealand	2.679	5.4	5.63	5.87	6.13
“Granite”	Larchford, Ontario	2.683	5.7	6.13	6.25	6.41
Albite	Sylmar, PA	2.687	6.40	—	6.65	6.76
Granodiorite	Butte, MT	2.705	4.4	—	6.35	6.56
Graywacke	Quebec	2.705	5.4	—	6.04	6.28
Serpentinite	CA	2.710	5.8	—	6.08	6.31
Slate	Medford, MA	2.734	5.49	—	5.91	6.22
“Charnockite”	Pallavaram, India	2.740	6.15	—	6.30	6.46
Granodiorite gneiss	NH	2.758	4.4	—	6.07	6.30
Tonalite	Val Verde, CA	2.763	5.1	—	6.43	6.60
Anorthosite	Tahawus, NY	2.768	6.73	—	6.90	7.02
Anorthosite	Stillwater; Complex, MT	2.770	6.5	—	7.01	7.10
Augite syenite	Ontario	2.780	5.7	—	6.63	6.79
Mica schist	Woodsville, VT	2.797	5.7	—	6.48	6.64
Serpentinite	Ludlow, VT	2.798	6.4	—	6.57	6.84
Quartz diorite	San Luis Rey quad., CA	2.798	5.1	—	6.52	6.71
Anorthosite	Bushveld; Complex	2.807	5.7	6.92	7.05	7.21
Chlorite schist	Chester; Quarry, VT	2.841	4.8	—	6.82	7.07
Quartz diorite	Dedham, MA	2.906	5.5	—	6.53	6.71
Talc schist	Chester, VT	2.914	4.9	—	6.50	6.97
Gabbro	Mellen, WI	2.931	6.8	7.04	7.09	7.21
Diabase	Centerville, VA	2.976	6.14	—	6.76	6.93
Diabase	Holyoke, MA	2.977	6.25	6.40	6.47	6.63
Norite	Pertoria, Transvaal	2.978	6.6	7.02	7.11	7.28
Dunite	Webster, NC	2.980	6.0	—	6.46	6.79
Diabase	Sudbury, Ontario	3.003	6.4	6.67	6.76	6.91
Diabase	Frederick, MD	3.012	6.76	—	6.80	6.92
Gabbro	French; Creek, PA	3.054	5.8	6.74	7.02	7.23
Amphibolite	Madison Co., MT	3.120	6.89	—	7.12	7.35
Jadeite	Japan	3.180	7.6	—	8.22	8.28
Actinoliter schist	Chester, VT	3.194	6.61	—	7.20	7.54
Dunite	Webster, NC	3.244	7.0	—	7.59	7.78
Pyroxenite	Sonoma Co., CA	3.247	6.8	—	7.79	8.01
Dunite	Mt. Dun, New Zealand	3.258	7.5	7.69	7.80	8.00
Dunite	Balsam; Gap, NC	3.267	7.0	7.82	8.01	8.28
Bronzitite	Stillwater; Complex, MT	3.279	7.42	—	7.65	7.83
Dunite	Addie, NC	3.304	7.70	—	8.05	8.28
Dunite	Twin Sisters; Peaks, WA	3.312	7.7	8.11	8.27	8.42
Eclogite	Tanganyika	3.328	6.64	7.30	7.46	7.71
Jadeite	Burma	3.331	8.45	—	8.69	8.78
Harzburgite	Bushveld; Complex	3.369	6.9	7.74	7.81	7.95
Eclogite	Kimberley	3.376	7.17	7.65	7.73	7.87
Eclogite	Sunnmore, Norway	3.376	5.2	—	7.30	7.69
Eclogite	Healdsburg, CA	3.441	7.31	—	7.81	8.01
Garnet	CT	3.561	6.3	—	8.55	8.99
Dunite	Moonihoek; Mine, Transvaal	3.744	6.7	7.13	7.21	7.36

== See also ==
- Archie's law
- Byerlee's law
