= Karl V. Teeter =

American linguist (1929–2007)

Karl van Duyn Teeter
- Born: March 2, 1929; Berkeley, California
- Died: April 20, 2007 (aged 78); Cambridge, Massachusetts
- Known for: work on the Algic languages
- Spouse: Anita Maria Bonacorsi (m. 1951)

Academic background
- Education: University of California at Berkeley (BA, Ph.D.)
- Doctoral advisor: Mary Haas

Academic work
- Discipline: linguistics
- Institutions: Harvard University
- Doctoral students: Ives Goddard

Karl van Duyn Teeter (March 2, 1929 – April 20, 2007) was an American linguist known especially for his work on the Algic languages.

== Life and work ==
Teeter was born in Berkeley, California, to Charles Edwin Teeter Jr., a college professor of physical chemistry, and Lura May (née Shaffner) Teeter, later in life a college professor in philosophy. Raised in Lexington, Massachusetts, he dropped out of high school and joined the United States Army, where he served as a Supply Sergeant from 1951 to 1954. In 1951, Teeter married Anita Maria Bonacorsi, the daughter of Sicilian immigrants. Sent to Japan to serve in the occupation forces, he became deeply interested in the Japanese language and on returning received a bachelor's degree in Oriental Languages from the University of California at Berkeley. There he continued his studies as a graduate student in linguistics. His dissertation, supervised by Mary Haas, was a description of the soon-to-be-extinct Wiyot language, on which he consulted with the last speaker of that language, Della Prince.

Teeter's work on Wiyot not only provided the last and best data for this language, but set the stage for the resolution of the Ritwan controversy. Teeter not only provided crucial data, but recognized many of the correspondences with Algonquian cited by Mary Haas. He later contributed some of the grammatical arguments which, along with those made by his student Ives Goddard, finally settled the question.

With field work on Wiyot no longer possible, Teeter turned his attention to Malecite-Passamaquoddy, a distantly related Algonquian language of New Brunswick and Maine. His work on this language stimulated that of Philip LeSourd.

After a term from 1959 to 1962 as Junior Fellow at Harvard University, Teeter was appointed assistant professor of linguistics. He remained at Harvard for the remainder of his career, eventually retiring in 1989 as Professor of Linguistics.

In 1968, he signed the "Writers and Editors War Tax Protest" pledge, vowing to refuse tax payments in protest against the Vietnam War.

He continued to work far into his retirement, concentrating on completing the lexicon of Wiyot on which he had been working since his student days, and encouraging research on endangered languages through participation in such organizations as the Foundation for Endangered Languages.

== See also ==
- Teeter's law

== Bibliography ==
- The Wiyot Language (University of California Press Publications in Linguistics 37, 1964)
- Descriptive linguistics in America: Triviality vs. irrelevance, (Word 20.197-206, 1964)
- Wiyot Handbook (Algonquian and Iroquoian Linguistics Memoirs 10 and 11, 1993)
