= Tony Thirlwall =

British economist (1941–2023)

Anthony Thirlwall
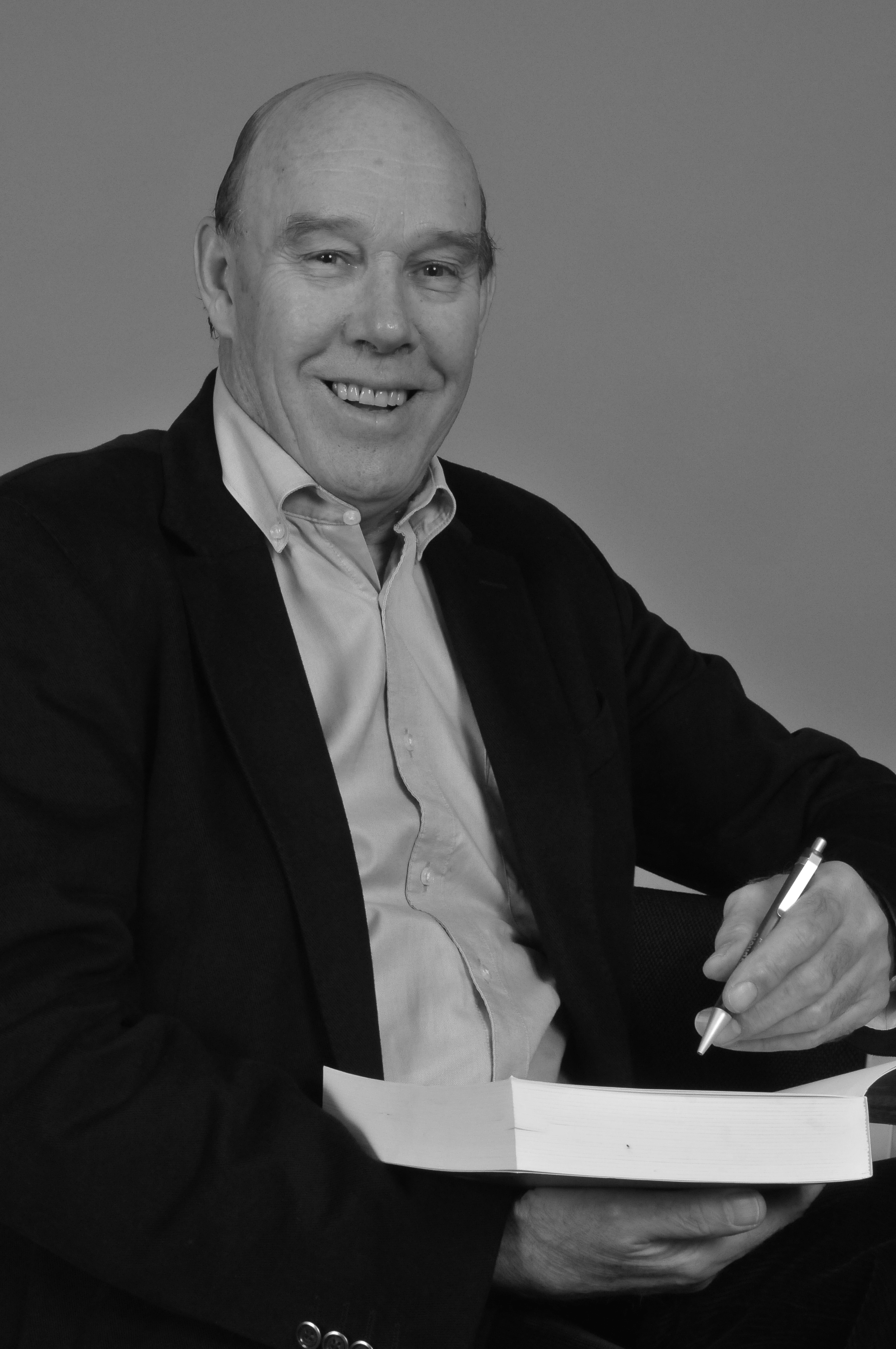
- Born: Anthony Philip Thirlwall; 21 April 1941
- Died: 8 November 2023 (aged 82)

Academic background
- Education: Cambridge University; Clark University; University of Leeds

Academic work
- Institutions: University of Kent; University of Leeds
- Notable ideas: New economic geography
- Website: Information at IDEAS / RePEc

Anthony Philip Thirlwall (21 April 1941 – 8 November 2023) was a British economist who was Professor of Applied Economics at the University of Kent. He made major contributions to regional economics; the analysis of unemployment and inflation; balance of payments theory, and to growth and development economics with particular reference to developing countries. He was the author of the bestselling textbook Economics of Development: Theory and Evidence (Palgrave Macmillan) now in its ninth edition. He was also the biographer and literary executor of the famous Cambridge economist Nicholas Kaldor. Perhaps his most notable contribution was to show that if long-run balance of payments equilibrium is a requirement for a country, its growth of national income can be approximated by the ratio of the growth of exports to the income elasticity of demand for imports (Thirlwall's Law).

== Early life and education ==
Anthony Philip Thirlwall was born on 21 April 1941. He was educated at the Harrow Weald County Grammar School (1952–59) where he was first taught economics by Merlyn Rees who later became Home Secretary in the Government of James Callaghan 1976-79. He then attended University of Leeds (1959–62); Clark University (USA)(1962–63), and Cambridge University (1963–64).

== Career ==
Thirlwall started his teaching career as a teaching assistant at Clark University (USA) in 1962 and then as an economics tutor at Cambridge University 1963-64. He then went to the University of Leeds as an assistant lecturer from 1964 to 1966. In 1966 he joined the new University of Kent and was appointed Professor of Applied Economics in 1976. During his time at Kent he held several advisory and visiting positions: the Ministry of Overseas Development (1966); the Department of Employment and Productivity (1968–70); West Virginia University (1967); Princeton University (1971–72); University of Papua New Guinea (1974); Cambridge University (1979, 1986); Melbourne University (1981, 1988), and La Trobe University (1994). He was guest lecturer at the Technical University of Lisbon (1984); National Autonomous University of Mexico (2000); and Mexico's National Polytechnic Institute (2008 and 2011).

Between 1971 and 1991 he organised eleven biennial Keynes Seminars at Keynes College, University of Kent, to commemorate the life and work of John Maynard Keynes. In the 1980s he served on the Council and Executive Committee of the Royal Economic Society and edited the conference volumes of the Confederation of European Economic Associations. In the 1990s he was active in the campaign against Britain joining the Euro, being a Trustee of the New Europe Research Trust and a Council Member of Business for Sterling. He was later General Editor of The Great Thinkers in Economics Series published by Palgrave Macmillan.

=== Consultancy ===
Pacific Islands Development Programme in Hawaii (1989–90), the African Development Bank (1993–94), Tongan Development Bank (1996), the Asian Development Bank (2003), and the United Nations Conference on Trade and Development (UNCTAD) (2004–06).

=== Editorial role ===
Served on the editorial boards of:

- Journal of Development Studies (1979–2006)
- Journal of Post Keynesian Economics (1988–)
- African Development Review (1998– )
- International Journal of Human Development (2005– )
- Estudios de Economia, Portugal (1997–2002)

== Death ==
Tony Thirlwall died on 8 November 2023, at the age of 82.

== Key works ==
- Economics of Development: Theory and Evidence (Palgrave Macmillan). First edition 1972. Ninth edition 2011. (Chinese and Greek translations). ISBN 0-230-22229-3
- Inflation, Saving and Growth in Developing Economies (Macmillan, 1974; St Martin’s Press, USA, 1975). Spanish Edition, El Moderna, Mexico, 1978. ISBN 0-333-17310-4
- Regional Growth and Unemployment in the United Kingdom (with R. Dixon), (Macmillan, 1975; Holmes and Meier, USA, 1975). ISBN 0-333-15561-0
- Financing Economic Development (Macmillan 1976), ISBN 0-333-17792-4; Greek Edition, Scientific Editions Publishing Company 1977; Spanish Edition, Vicens-Vives, 1978; Turkish Edition, Ak Yayinlari, 1980.
- Balance of Payments Theory and the United Kingdom Experience (Macmillan). First Edition, 1980. Fourth Edition, 1992 (with H.D. Gibson), ISBN 0-333-42109-4
- Nicholas Kaldor (Harvester Wheatsheaf Press, 1987 and New York University Press, USA, 1987). ISBN 0-7450-0108-4
- Deindustrialisation (with S. Bazen) (Heinemann). First Edition, 1989. Third Edition 1997.
- The Performance and Prospects of the Pacific Island Economies in the World Economy (University of Hawaii Press, 1991). ISBN 0-86638-130-9
- Economic Growth and the Balance of Payments Constraint (with J. McCombie), (Macmillan, 1994). ISBN 0-312-10183-X
- The Economics of Growth and Development: Selected Essays of A.P. Thirlwall Vol 1 (Edward Elgar, 1995). ISBN 1-85898-207-3
- Macroeconomic Issues from a Keynesian Perspective: Selected Essays of A.P. Thirlwall, Vol 2 (Edward Elgar, 1997). ISBN 1-85898-605-2
- The Euro and 'Regional Divergence' in Europe New Europe Research Trust, 2000. ISBN 0-9536360-1-1
- The Nature of Economic Growth : An Alternative Framework for Understanding the Performance of Nations (Edward Elgar, 2002), ISBN 1-84376-338-9. Spanish Edition, Fondo de Cultura Económica, Mexico 2003; Japanese Edition, Gakubunsha Co. Ltd 2003; Portuguese Edition, IPEA, Brazil, 2005.
- Trade, the Balance of Payments and Exchange Rate Policy in Developing Countries (Edward Elgar, 2003). ISBN 1-84376-229-3
- 978-0-415-32631-5 Essays on Balance of Payments Constrained Growth (Routledge Press, 2004) (with J.McCombie). ISBN 0-415-32631-1
- Trade Liberalisation and The Poverty of Nations (Edward Elgar, 2008) (with P. Pacheco-López). ISBN 1-84720-822-3
- Economic Growth in an Open Developing Economy: The Role of Structure and Demand (Edward Elgar, 2013). ISBN 9781781955338

== Bibliography ==
- A. P. Thirlwall (b. 1941) in Exemplary Economists, vol. 2, edited by R. Backhouse and R. Middleton (Edward Elgar, 2000).
- Festschrift Volume : Growth and Economic Development: Essays in Honour of A. P. Thirlwall, edited by P. Arestis. J. McCombie and R. Vickerman (Edward Elgar, 2007)

== Website ==
- University of Kent, Thirlwall's Entry
