= Korte's third law of apparent motion =

Psychophysics concept

In psychophysics, Korte's third law of apparent motion is an observation relating the phenomenon of apparent motion to the distance and duration between two successively presented stimuli.

== Formulation ==
Korte's four laws were first proposed in 1915 by Adolf Korte. The third law, particularly, describes how the increase in distance between two stimuli narrows the range of interstimulus intervals (ISI), which produce the apparent motion. It holds that there is a requirement for the proportional decrease in the frequency in which two stimulators are activated in alternation with the increase in ISI to ensure the quality of apparent motion. One identified violation of the Korte's law occurs if the shortest path between seen arm positions is not possible anatomically. This was demonstrated by Maggie Shiffrar and Jennifer Freyd using a picture that showed a woman demonstrating two positions. This highlighted the problem in taking the shortest path to perform the alternating postures.

The laws were composed of general statements (laws) describing beta movement in the sense of "optimal motion". These outlined several constraints for obtaining the percept of apparent motion between flashes: "(1) larger separations require higher intensities, (2) slower presentation rates require higher intensities, (3) larger separations require slower presentation rates, (4) longer flash durations require shorter intervals .

A modern formulation of the law is that the greater the length of a path between two successively presented stimuli, the greater the stimulus onset asynchrony (SOA) must be for an observer to perceive the two stimuli as a single mobile object. Typically, the relationship between distance and minimal SOA is linear.

Arguably, Korte's third law is counterintuitive. One might expect that successive stimuli are less likely to be perceived as a single object as both distance and interval increase, and therefore, a negative relationship should be observed instead. In fact, such a negative relationship can be observed as well as Korte's law. Which relationship holds depends on speed. Korte's law also involves a constancy of velocity through apparent motion and it is said that data do not support it.
