= Clarke's three laws =

Axioms proposed by British science fiction writer Arthur C. Clarke

British science fiction writer Arthur C. Clarke formulated three adages that are known as Clarke's three laws, of which the third law – that "any sufficiently advanced technology is indistinguishable from magic" – is the best known and most widely cited. They are part of his ideas in his extensive writings about the future.

== The laws ==
The laws are:

1. When a distinguished but elderly scientist states that something is possible, he is almost certainly right. When he states that something is impossible, he is very probably wrong.
2. The only way of discovering the limits of the possible is to venture a little way past them into the impossible.
3. Any sufficiently advanced technology is indistinguishable from magic. This is often referred to simply as "Clarke's Law".

== Origins ==
One account stated that Clarke's laws were developed after the editor of his works in French started numbering the author's assertions. All three laws appear in Clarke's essay "Hazards of Prophecy: The Failure of Imagination", first published in Profiles of the Future (1962); however, they were not all published at the same time. Clarke's first law was proposed in the 1962 edition of the essay, as "Clarke's Law" in Profiles of the Future.

The second law is offered as a simple observation in the same essay but its status as Clarke's second law was conferred by others. It was initially a derivative of the first law and formally became Clarke's second law where the author proposed the third law in the 1973 revision of Profiles of the Future, which included an acknowledgement. It was also here that Clarke wrote about the third law in these words: "As three laws were good enough for Newton, I have modestly decided to stop there".

The third law is the best known and most widely cited. It was published in a 1968 letter to Science magazine and eventually added to the 1973 revision of the "Hazards of Prophecy" essay.

== Variants of the third law ==
The third law has inspired many snowclones and other variations:

- Any sufficiently advanced extraterrestrial intelligence is indistinguishable from God. (Shermer's last law)
- Any sufficiently advanced act of benevolence is indistinguishable from malevolence (referring to artificial intelligence)
- Any sufficiently advanced incompetence is indistinguishable from malice (Grey's law)
- Any sufficiently advanced garbage is indistinguishable from magic. (Sterling's corollary to Clarke's law) This idea also underlies the setting of the novel Roadside Picnic by Arkady and Boris Strugatsky, in which human stalkers try to navigate the location of an alien "visitation", trying to make sense of technically advanced items discarded by the aliens.
- Any sufficiently advanced garbage is indistinguishable from a rigged demo.
- Any sufficiently familiar technology is indistinguishable from nature.
- Any sufficiently analysed magic is indistinguishable from science.
- Any sufficiently advanced technology is indistinguishable from a completely ad-hoc plot device.

== Corollaries and follow-ups ==
Isaac Asimov's follow-up to Clarke's First Law:

When, however, the lay public rallies round an idea that is denounced by distinguished but elderly scientists and supports that idea with great fervour and emotion – the distinguished but elderly scientists are then, after all, probably right.

A contrapositive of the third law is "Any technology distinguishable from magic is insufficiently advanced." (Gehm's corollary)

== See also ==
- List of eponymous laws – Adages and sayings named after a person
- Niven's laws – Author Larry Niven's rules about how the universe works
- Parkinson's law – Adage that work expands to fill its available time
- Three Laws of Robotics – Fictional set of rules by Isaac Asimov
