= Byerlee's law =

Law in rheology

In rheology, Byerlee's law, also known as Byerlee's friction law concerns the shear stress (τ) required to slide one rock over another. The rocks have macroscopically flat surfaces, but the surfaces have small asperities that make them "rough." For a given experiment and at normal stresses (σ_{n}) below about 2000 bars (200 MPa) the shear stress increases approximately linearly with the normal stress (τ = 0.85 σ_{n}, where τ and σ_{n} is in units of MPa) and is highly dependent on rock type and the character (roughness) of the surfaces, see Mohr-Coulomb friction law. Byerlee's law states that with increased normal stress the required shear stress continues to increase, but the rate of increase decreases (τ = 0.5 + 0.6σ_{n}), where τ and σ_{n} are in units of MPa, and becomes nearly independent of rock type.

The law describes an important property of crustal rock, and can be used to determine when slip along a geological fault takes place.

The law is named after the American geophysicist James Byerlee, who derived it experimentally in 1978.

== See also ==
- Archie's law
- Birch's law
