= David Premack =

American psychologist

- Born: 26 October 1925; Aberdeen, South Dakota
- Died: 11 June 2015 (aged 89); Santa Barbara, California
- Education: University of Minnesota (PhD, 1955)
- Known for: Premack's principle Theory of mind Cognitive psychology
- Scientific career
- Fields: Experimental psychology, Comparative psychology, Cognitive psychology
- Workplaces: University of Pennsylvania
- Thesis: Influence of prior learning of one discrimination component on learning of the second component when the two components are presented in combination (1955)

David Premack (October 26, 1925 – June 11, 2015) was an American psychologist who was a professor of psychology at the University of Pennsylvania. He was educated at the University of Minnesota when logical positivism was in full bloom. The departments of Psychology and Philosophy were closely allied. Herbert Feigl, Wilfred Sellars, and Paul Meehl led the philosophy seminars, while Group Dynamics was led by Leon Festinger and Stanley Schachter.

== Research ==
Premack started in primate research in 1954 at the Yerkes Primate Biology Laboratory at Orange Park outside Jacksonville, Florida. His first two chimpanzee subjects, Sarah and Gussie, started at the University of Missouri and traveled with him to the University of California, Santa Barbara, and then to the University of Pennsylvania, where he had nine chimpanzee subjects.

Premack's first publication (1959) was a new theory of reinforcement (which became known as Premack's principle). It argued that the more probable response in any pair of responses could reinforce the less probable response—demonstrating that reinforcement is a relative, not an absolute property.

This theory predicts six conditions, all of which have been supported by evidence:

1. Reinforcement is a relative property. Responses A, B, C have a descending rank order of probability. A will therefore reinforce both B and C. C will reinforce neither. This suggests that reinforcement is an absolute property. However, B corrects this view. B will reinforce C, but not A. B is both a reinforcer and not a reinforcer. Reinforcement is therefore a relative property.
2. Reinforcement is a reversible property. When drinking is more probable than running, drinking reinforces running. When the probabilities are reversed, running reinforces drinking.
3. Historically, consummatory responses, eating and drinking, have served exclusively as reinforcers, but consummatory responses are, like any other response, subject to reinforcement.
4. Reinforcement and punishment, traditionally contrasted as opposites, are in fact equivalent except for sign. If response A leads contingently to B, and B is more probable than A, A will increase in frequency (reinforcement); conversely, if A leads contingently to B, and B is less probable than A, A will decrease in frequency (punishment). The major contrast is not between reward and punishment; but between reward and punishment as contrasted with freedom. Freedom is the condition in which stimuli are freely (not contingently) available to an individual.
5. When motorized running is more probable than lever pressing but less probable than drinking, then running reinforces lever pressing and punishes drinking. In other words, the same response can be both a reinforcer and a punisher - at the same time and for the same individual.
6. The equivalence of reinforcement and punishment is further suggested in this interesting fact: rats are either sensitive to both reinforcement and punishment, or insensitive to both; they are never sensitive to one but insensitive to the other.

Premack introduced the concept of Theory of Mind, with Guy Woodruff, in an article published in 1978. This has proven to be a fruitful concept in psychology and neuroscience. For example, hundreds of articles have been published on theory of mind in fields ranging from comparative psychology studies of cognitive capacities of animals to human developmental psychology studies of infant cognition to social neuroscience studies of the brain substrates that mediate simulations of mental processes in other individuals.

Premack's analysis of same/different led him and his associates to show that chimpanzees can do analogies. Sameness/difference is not a relation between objects (e.g., A same A, A different B) or properties, it is a relation between relations: For example: consider the relation between AA and BB, CD and EF on the one hand; and AA and CD on the other. AA and BB are both instances of same; the relation between them is "same." CD and EF are both instances different; the relation between them therefore is "same." AA is an instance of same, and CD an instance of different; the relation between them is "different." This analysis set the stage for teaching chimpanzees the word "same" for AA, and "different" for CD. When taught these words, chimpanzees spontaneously formed simple analogies between: physically similar relations (e.g., small circle is to large circle as small triangle is to large triangle), and functionally similar relations (e.g., key is to lock as can opener is to can).

A nonverbal method for testing causal inference designed by Premack made it possible to show that both young children and chimpanzees are capable of causal inference.

Premack demonstrated that chimpanzees can reassemble a disassembled face, placing the eyes, nose, mouth in the appropriate place. In addition he showed that chimpanzees are capable of symbolic behavior. After viewing themselves in a mirror wearing, on different occasions, a hat, glasses, necklace, and given the picture of a face, 48 hours later, the chimpanzees applied clay to the top of the head (hat), to the eyes (glasses), and the throat (necklace) respectively.

Premack further argued that young children divide the world into two kinds of objects, those that move only when acted upon by other objects, and those that are self-propelled and move on their own.

He argued that infants attribute intentionality to self-propelled objects that show goal-directed action. Further that infants attribute value to the interaction of intentional objects, e.g. positive value to gentle actions such as one object caressing another, negative value to harsh actions such as one object hitting another. In addition infants assign positive value when one object helps another to achieve its goal, negative value when one object hinders another from achieving its goal. Finally, he and Ann Premack argued: infants equate caressing with helping (despite their physical dissimilarity); and equate hitting with hindering (despite their physical dissimilarity.

Premack has focused on cognitive differences between the intelligence of animals and humans. Human competence is domain general, capable of serving indeterminately many goals; animal competence is a narrow adaptation, serving only one goal. For instance, humans teach all possible activities (different ones in different cultures), whereas meerkats and cats, two of very few animals that teach at all, teach one activity: how to eat dangerous food such as scorpions in the one case, and how to stalk mice in the other. What explains the domain-generality of human competence? Human competence is composed of an interweaving of multiple evolutionarily-independent components; animal competence of a single evolutionary component.

Premack debated of the nature of linguistic performance in apes with Jean Piaget and Noam Chomsky at the Centre Royaumont pour une Science de l'Homme, during one of the last moments when Jacques Monod could participate in intellectual debates shortly before his death.

He died at the age of 89, and was buried at Riverside National Cemetery on June 17, 2015.
