= Teeter's law =

Observation about the biases of historical linguists

Teeter's law is a wry observation about the biases of historical linguists, explaining how different investigators can arrive at radically divergent conceptions of the proto-language of a family:

The language of the family you know best always turns out to be the most archaic.

Although the law is named after the Americanist linguist Karl Teeter, it apparently does not appear in any of Teeter's works. It is customarily quoted from a 1976 review by the Indo-European linguist Calvert Watkins of Paul Friedrich's Proto-Indo-European syntax: the order of meaningful elements. Watkins argued that Friedrich, after criticizing other scholars for overemphasizing particular branches of the family, had based his reconstruction of Proto-Indo-European syntax entirely on Homeric Greek.

== See also ==
- Blind men and an elephant
