= Now! (1979–1981 magazine) =

NOW! was a British weekly news magazine founded by entrepreneur Sir James Goldsmith, partly as a vehicle for dissemination of his right-wing political opinions. The magazine was headquartered in London.

== History and profile ==
NOW! was established in 1979, taking advantage of the market opportunity created by the closure of The Times and The Sunday Times during a labour dispute. This first issue was dated 14–20 September 1979, ran to 142 pages and was priced at 50p. Despite good sales for the first issue, NOW! misjudged the market and the competition from Sunday newspapers and the news magazines The Economist, Time and Newsweek. It never met circulation targets and incurred heavy losses. After 84 issues, Goldsmith closed it in early May 1981.

Issue one featured on the cover a grainy black-and-white photograph of Brigadier Khalil al-Azzawi, director of Iraqi Military Intelligence with the banner "Exclusive: How this man's agents spy on Britain..." and a tag for a "Special NOW! Enquiry" on "What the Young Generation really thinks". Senior staff and contributors included, Frank Johnson, Clive Barnes, Art Buchwald and Patrick Hutber.
