= Lem's law =

Aphorism that "no one reads"

Lem's law (Polish: Prawo Lema) is an adage suggested by the Polish science fiction writer and philosopher Stanisław Lem. It is best known from his faux review "Jedna Minuta" ("One Minute") of the non-existing book One Human Minute (1984), but he formulated it in his correspondence already in 1978.

Lem's law, as translated into English, is stated as follows: (Note: There are several published versions of Lem's law.: Lem's law as written in the context of his faux review (in: "Provokacja", 1984, p. 58): "Jak wiadomo, wydawcy nie boją się niczego tak jak wydawania książek, gdyż w pełni już działa tak zwane prawo Lema („Nikt nie czyta; jeśli czyta, nic nie rozumie; jeśli rozumie, natychmiast zapomina”), ze względu na powszechny brak czasu, nadmierną podaż książek oraz zbytnią doskonałość reklamy."; Sława i Fortuna, ISBN 978-83-0804934-1, a selection of Stanisław Lem's letters to his translator Michael Kandel during 1972–1987, p. 621 (letter dated by February 16, 1978), states Lem's laws as follows: "1) Nikt nic nie czyta; 2) Jeśli ktoś coś czyta, to nic nie rozumie; 3) Jeśli ktoś coś czyta i rozumie, to natychmiast zapomina."; A similar form was published in Lem's essay "Posthuma I": "Primo, nikt nic nie czyta. Secundo, jeśli czyta, to nic nie rozumie. Tertio, jeśli czyta i nawet rozumie, to natychmiast zapomina."; Lem's translator into Russian, Konstantin Dushenko, noticed that Lem had stated this law in a slightly different form in a 1979 interview to a Warsaw students' weekly Itd.; The law had also been expressed in German in Lem's last interview (November 2005).)

"No one reads; if someone does read, he doesn't understand; if he understands, he immediately forgets."

The "reviewed" fictional book One Human Minute is supposedly an ideal book that addresses the concern expressed in "Lem's law".

Lem's law follows the structure of the argument about the non-existence of the world and the impossibility of knowledge and communication about it (even if it could exist) presented by Gorgias of Leontinoi.

In an interview with Marek Oramus, who asked Lem how he came up with his law, Lem said that it resulted from his pondering upon the immense flood of publications with an inevitable repetitiveness of various conclusions. And the third part is valid because a person has to free some space in their head for yet another piece of information.

Lem's law is related to what Juliusz Łukasiewicz called the "ignorance explosion". In Poland, Lem's law is often referred to as an expression of the conviction that the overall level of literacy and general education declines. More generally, it has also been used as a humorous description of Lem's critique of the contemporary state of our civilization.
