= Van Loon's law =

Adage attributed to Hendrik Willem van Loon

Van Loon's law is a statement drawn from American economist Stuart Chase's 1929 book Men and Machines. It may originate with Dutch-American historian, journalist, and childrens' book author Hendrik Willem van Loon.

The law states that "the amount of mechanical development will always be in inverse ratio to the number of slaves that happen to be at a country’s disposal."
