= Joy's law (management) =

Principle that most smart people work elsewhere

In management, Joy's law is the principle that "no matter who you are, most of the smartest people work for someone else,” attributed to Sun Microsystems co-founder Bill Joy. Joy was prompted to state this observation through his dislike of Bill Gates' view of "Microsoft as an IQ monopolist." He argued that, instead, "It's better to create an ecology that gets all the world’s smartest people toiling in your garden for your goals. If you rely solely on your own employees, you’ll never solve all your customers' needs." Core to this principle is the definition of smart within the context of the quotation. Smart "refers to capability but not willingness to work for someone." Furthermore, "the fact that you are smart for one company does not make you smart for another." Richard Pettinger, Director of Information Management for Business, UCL The law highlights an essential problem that is faced by many modern businesses, "that in any given sphere of activity most of the pertinent knowledge will reside outside the boundaries of any one organization, and the central challenge [is] to find ways to access that knowledge."

In computing, the same Bill Joy devised a simple mathematical function regarding the increase in microprocessor speed over time which is also referred to as Joy's Law.

== Underlying principles of knowledge for Joy’s law ==
Friedrich Hayek, an economist and philosopher known for his defense of classical liberalism, observed that “knowledge is unevenly distributed.” The ‘knowledge’ that Hayek refers to is the knowledge that the ‘smartest people’ possess in Joy’s law. Hayek states that the problem of a rational economic order is because knowledge that we wish to grasp never exists in a “concentrated or integrated form but solely as the dispersed bits of incomplete and frequently contradictory knowledge which all the separate individuals possess.” In other words, it is impossible to aggregate all the knowledge that exists. This explains that Joy is right in saying that “most of the smartest people work for someone else.”

Eric von Hippel, a professor of technological innovation in the MIT Sloan School of Management, is known partly for his principle of knowledge being ‘sticky’. This highlights the difficulty of transporting knowledge from one place to another. Stickiness is defined as the cost required to “transfer a unit of information to a specified locus in a form usable by a given information seeker. When this cost is low, information stickiness is low; when it is high, stickiness is high.” “When Joy says that most of the smart people work for someone else, it is not because companies are hiring dumb people. It is not because employees in any given firm are not smart. It is because of the nature of knowledge – getting hold of it is tough. It is unevenly distributed and sticky.”

== Joy's law in open innovation ==
One interpretation of Joy’s Law is that of Todd Park, former Chief Technology Officer of the United States, through his summary of the challenge of open innovation in government: “Even if you get the best and the brightest to work for you, there will always be an infinite number of other, smarter people employed by others.”
