= Thirlwall's Law =

Economics model concerning balance of payments

Thirlwall's law (named after Anthony Thirlwall) states that if long-run balance of payments equilibrium on current account is a requirement, and the real exchange rate stays relatively constant, then the long run growth of a country can be approximated by the ratio of the growth of exports to the income elasticity of demand for imports.

If the real exchange rate varies considerably, but the price elasticities of demand for imports and exports are low, the long run growth of the economy will then be determined by the growth of world income times the ratio of the income elasticity of demand for exports and imports which are determined by the structural characteristics of countries. One important example of this is that if developing countries produce mainly primary products and low value manufactured goods with a low income elasticity of demand, while developed countries specialise in high income elasticity manufactured goods the developing countries will grow at a relatively slower rate (Davidson, 1991).

Thirlwall's balance of payments constrained growth model –or Thirlwall's Law- is often called the dynamic Harrod trade multiplier result following Roy Harrod’s (1933) static foreign trade multiplier result that Y = X/m, where Y is national income; X is exports and m is the marginal propensity to import, which is derived under the same assumptions as Thirlwall's Law (O’Hara, 1999).

The assumption of balance of payments equilibrium on current account can be relaxed to allow capital flows (see Thirlwall and Nureldin Hussein, 1982), but for reasonable values of sustainable flows (e.g. 3% of GDP), capital flows make little empirical difference to the growth predictions of the basic model.

Since 1979, the model has been extensively tested (for surveys of the literature see McCombie and Thirlwall 1994, 2004) with broad support for both developed and developing countries. See also "PSL Quarterly Review Vol. 64 No.259 (2011)" and "Models of Balance of Payments Constrained Growth: History, Theory and Evidence (2012)"

The model provides an alternative to the supply side models of neo-classical growth theory which are closed economy models with no demand constraints. In the Thirlwall model the ultimate constraint on growth is a shortage of foreign exchange or the growth of exports to which factor supplies can adapt. It is changes in growth that equilibrate the balance of payments, not changes in relative prices in international trade.
