= Idiot-proof =

Designed to be proof against misuse or error

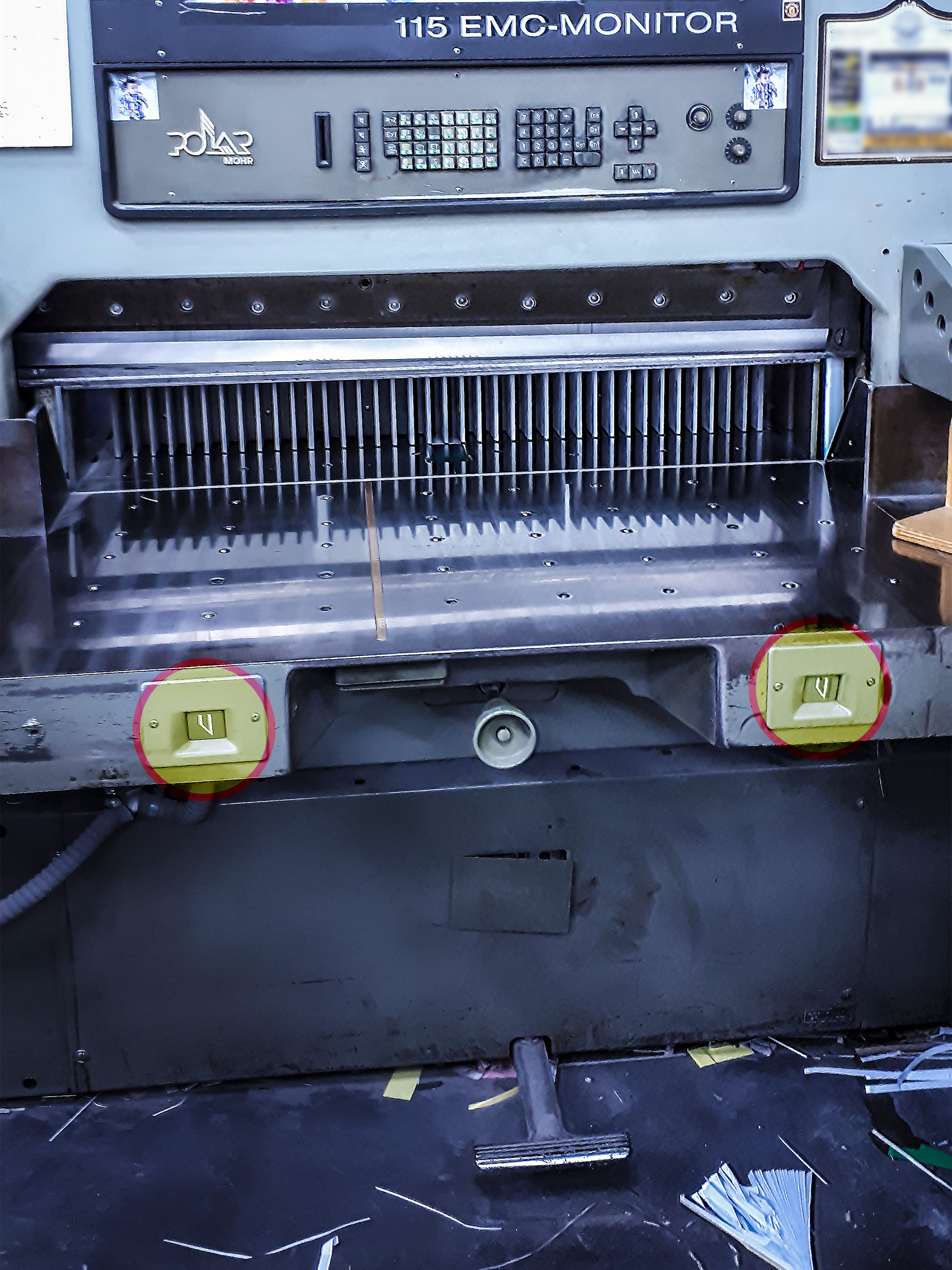
Paper cutting machine with two separate hand buttons and one leg pedal for its operation. Requiring most of the operator's limbs to be used to activate the machine prevents them from being in dangerous positions while it operates.

Idiot-proof refers to the process by which human error is minimized with designs that are easy to understand. This involves finding the causes of misuse, which can improve safety.

Idiot-proof design originated on the basis of safety, where the designer needed to predict, and hence prevent any possible danger of the misuse of the product, no matter how “idiotic”.

As a result, this approach has shaped many different forms of idiot-proofing that now appear in various industries, technologies, and routine tasks.

Two distinct definitions exist in the concept of idiot-proofing: mistakes and slips. When an error happens in decision making it is called a mistake, but if it happens in procedure it is called a slip. Idiot-proofing is also known as “mistake-proofing” or “error-proofing” where its objective is to prevent mistakes and slips.

Idiot-proof is similar to the Japanese concept of “poka-yoke”, which refers to mistaking proofing mechanisms that were originally applied to car manufacturing systems. The idea was introduced by Japanese engineer Shigeo Shingo to achieve zero defects and completely eliminate quality control inspections.

== History ==
Early approaches to idiot-proofing focused on preventing mistakes during operation by designing systems that made incorrect actions impossible or immediately noticeable. Manufacturing environments used physical guides, sensors, and control mechanisms that stopped a process when an error occurred, ensuring that mistakes could not continue through later steps. Industrial quality programs applied methods such as contact detection, fixed-value checks, and motion-step verification to block incorrect inputs and identify errors at their source before defects were produced. Procedures like source inspection and successive checks were introduced to detect the conditions that lead to mistakes, reflecting a shift toward preventing user error through design rather than relying on correction after the fact.

Research identified routine slips, attention failures, memory lapses, and interruptions as common causes of human error, and idiot-proofing techniques were structured so these errors would not affect the outcome of a task. These systems emphasized clear signals and visible indicators that allowed workers to recognize abnormal conditions quickly during operation. Protective safety features also influenced how users interacted with hazards. Safeguards could change patterns of risk exposure, and accident frequency or severity could vary depending on how users responded to added protective measures.

== Usage ==
While there is no specific idiot-proofing process, many fields employ various methods to reduce the likelihood and impact of human error. Whether applied to physical equipment or procedural workflows, the goal is to create conditions where errors are unlikely, immediately visible, or unable to cause serious consequences.

=== Physical and mechanical ===
Idiot-proofing modifies tools, tasks, or the work environment so errors are prevented, revealed early, or rendered harmless. Because many mistakes arise from automatic mental routines, distractions, or misleading cues, idiot-proofing introduces physical guides, warning indicators, and forcing functions that reduce ambiguity and block incorrect actions. These devices often make the right action the only action possible, ensuring errors are caught before they can create defects. The approach simplifies work, reduces mental burden, and supports human limitations rather than fighting them.

=== Computer science ===
Software and hardware emphasize the practice of designing systems that can handle user mistakes without crashing or losing data. As computers began to be used by more people without technical backgrounds, programs needed to account for incorrect inputs, accidental key presses, or other errors. Idiot-proof design focuses on checking for errors, giving clear messages, choosing safe defaults, and hiding unnecessary system details from users. These features help make technology more reliable, easier to use, and more accessible to people of all skill levels.

=== Procedural safety ===
In call centers, idiot-proofing is used to prevent both agent and consumer fraud. By preventing access to information or actions, mistakes made by people are limited. Customers enter their credit card numbers through their phone keypad, and a masked Dual-Tone Multi-Frequency app captures that information so agents do not have access to that data. The system verifies the number, then plays an automated summary of the charge and records the customer’s verbal confirmation. This “verbal signature” provides strong evidence for the agent and deters fraudulent chargebacks. Both the users and business feel at ease that fraud is automatically prevented.

== Feasibility ==
Several Murphy's law adages claim that idiot-proof systems cannot be made, for example "Nothing is foolproof to a sufficiently talented fool" and "If you make something idiot-proof, someone will just make a better idiot." Along those lines, Douglas Adams wrote in Mostly Harmless, "a common mistake that people make when trying to design something completely foolproof is to underestimate the ingenuity of complete fools".

== See also ==
- Defensive design
- Hanlon's razor
- Hostile architecture
- Inherent safety
- Murphy's law
- Poka-yoke
- Unintended consequences
- Worst-case scenario
