= Shit happens (disambiguation) =

"Shit happens" is a common slang phrase.

Shit Happens may refer to:

- Shit Happens, a DVD by the band Every Time I Die
- "Shit Happens", the second episode of the second season of Bad Girls (TV series)
