= Edward A. Murphy Jr. =

American engineer, coiner of Murphy's law (1918–1990)

Edward A. Murphy
- Murphy c. 1940s
- Born: Edward Aloysius Murphy Jr. January 11, 1918; Panama Canal Zone
- Died: July 17, 1990 (aged 72)
- Burial place: Los Angeles National Cemetery
- Education: United States Military Academy
- Military career
- Allegiance: United States
- Branch: United States Army; United States Air Force
- Service years: 1940–1947 (USA); 1947–1952 (USAF)
- Rank: Major
- Nickname: Ed
- Conflicts: Pacific Theatre of World War II, Korean War
- Other work: Research in aerospace engineering and reliability engineering

Edward Aloysius Murphy Jr. (January 11, 1918 – July 17, 1990) was an American aerospace engineer who worked on safety-critical systems. He is best known for his namesake "Murphy's law", which is said to be "Anything that can go wrong will go wrong".

Born in the Panama Canal Zone in 1918, Murphy was the eldest of five children. After attending high school in New Jersey, he went to the United States Military Academy at West Point, graduating in 1940. The same year he accepted a commission with the United States Army, and had pilot training with the United States Army Air Corps in 1941. During World War II he served in the Pacific Theater, India, China and Burma (now known as Myanmar), achieving the rank of major.

After the end of hostilities, in 1947 Murphy attended the United States Air Force Institute of Technology, becoming R&D Officer at the Wright Air Development Center of Wright-Patterson Air Force Base. It was while here that he became involved with the high-speed rocket sled experiments (USAF project MX981, 1949) which resulted in his invention of Murphy's law. (The actual principle was guidance to his engineers, to design components that could not be used mistakenly: "If a part can be installed in more than one position, it will be incorrectly installed in the field".) Murphy himself was reportedly unhappy with the common interpretation of his principle as a fatalistic resignation to fate and mischance. Murphy regarded the law as representing a major principle of defensive design, in which one should always assume worst-case scenarios. Murphy was said by his son to have regarded the many jocular versions of the law as "ridiculous, trivial and erroneous".

In 1952, having resigned from the United States Air Force, Murphy performed a series of rocket acceleration tests at Holloman Air Force Base, then returned to California to pursue a career in aircraft cockpit design for a series of private contractors. He worked on crew escape systems for some of the most famous experimental aircraft of the 20th century, including the F-4 Phantom II, the XB-70 Valkyrie, the SR-71 Blackbird, the B-1 Lancer, and the X-15 rocket plane.

== In popular culture ==
In 1982 the band Chéri reached number 1 on the Billboard Hot Dance Club Play chart with the song Murphy's Law, whose lyrics explain that the law is governing the life of an ex-partner.

In the Disney Channel animated series Milo Murphy's Law, the protagonist Milo Murphy is said to be a descendant of Edward A. Murphy. As a consequence of this he is frequently imperiled, in keeping with Murphy's law.

The daughter of Matthew McConaughey’s character in Interstellar is named Murphy, after Murphy’s law.

== See also ==
- List of Ig Nobel Prize winners
