= Poka-yoke =

Process that helps an equipment operator avoid mistakes

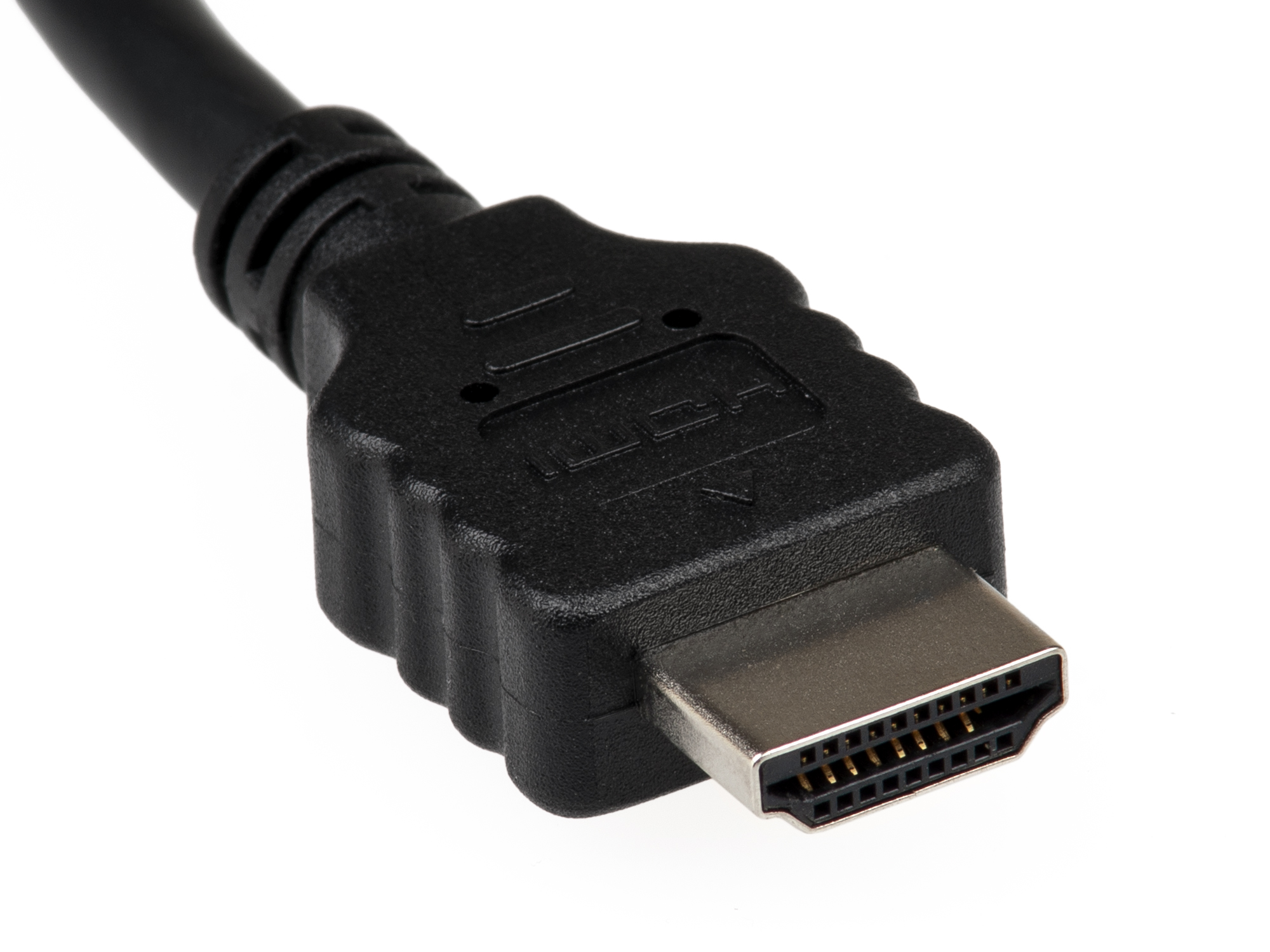
HDMI connectors exemplify poka-yoke: their asymmetric, tapered design mechanically prevents incorrect insertion

Poka-yoke (ポカヨケ; [poka joke]) is any mechanism in a process that helps an equipment operator avoid mistakes and defects by preventing, correcting, or drawing attention to human errors as they occur. It is a Japanese term that means "mistake-proofing" or "error prevention", and is also sometimes referred to as a forcing function or a behavior-shaping constraint.

The concept was formalized, and the term adopted, by Shigeo Shingo as part of the Toyota Production System.

== Etymology ==
Poka-yoke was originally baka-yoke, but as this means "fool-proofing" (or "idiot-proofing") the name was changed to the milder poka-yoke. Poka-yoke is derived from poka o yokeru (ポカを避ける), a term in shogi that means avoiding an unthinkably bad move.

== Usage and examples ==
More broadly, the term can refer to any behavior-shaping constraint designed into a process to prevent incorrect operation by the user.

A simple poka-yoke example is demonstrated when a driver of a car equipped with a manual gearbox must press on the clutch pedal (a process step, therefore a poka-yoke) prior to starting an automobile. The interlock serves to prevent unintended movement of the car. Another example of poka-yoke would be the car equipped with an automatic transmission, which has a switch that requires the car to be in "Park" or "Neutral" before the car can be started (some automatic transmissions require the brake pedal to be depressed as well). These serve as behavior-shaping constraints as the action of "car in Park (or Neutral)" or "foot depressing the clutch/brake pedal" must be performed before the car is allowed to start. The requirement of a depressed brake pedal to shift most of the cars with an automatic transmission from "Park" to any other gear is yet another example of a poka-yoke application. Over time, the driver's behavior is conformed with the requirements by repetition and habit.

When automobiles first started shipping with on-board GPS systems, it was not uncommon to use a forcing function which prevented the user from interacting with the GPS (such as entering in a destination) while the car was in motion. This ensures that the driver's attention is not distracted by the GPS. However, many drivers found this feature irksome, and the forcing function has largely been abandoned. This reinforces the idea that forcing functions are not always the best approach to shaping behavior.

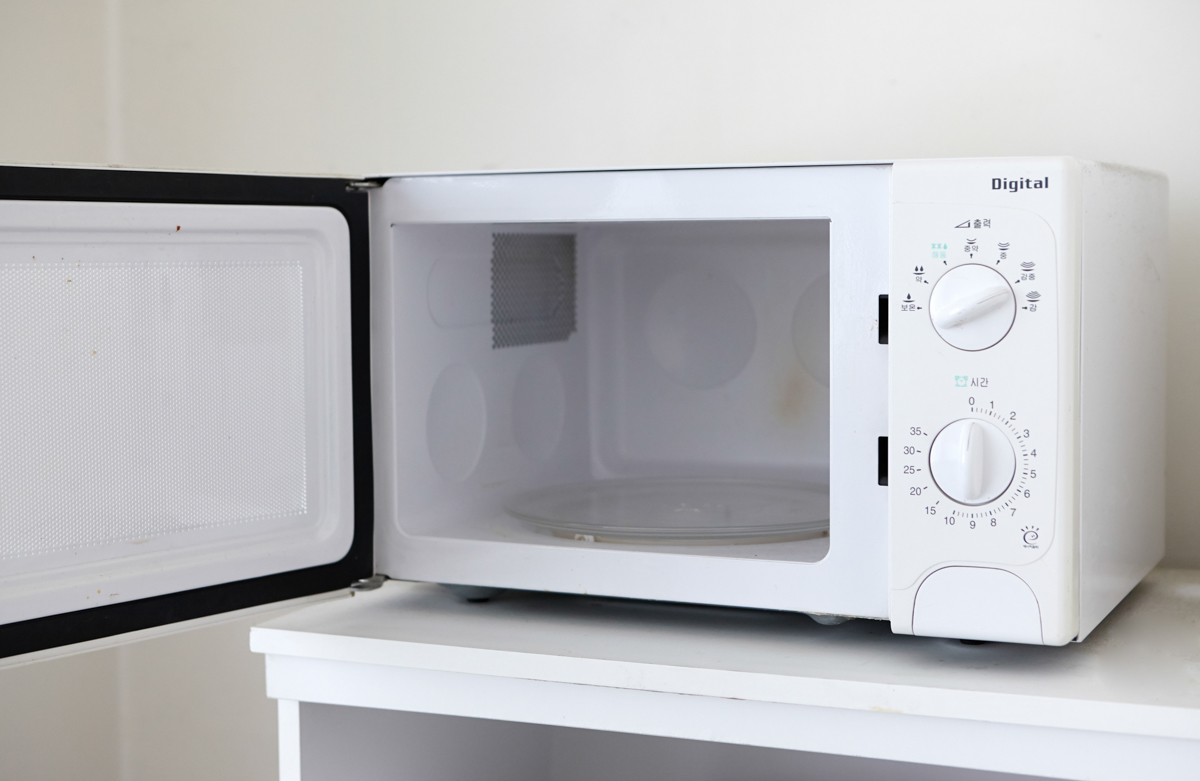
A microwave oven cannot be started while its door is open

The microwave oven provides another example of a forcing function. In all modern microwave ovens, it is impossible to start the microwave while the door is still open. Likewise, the microwave will shut off automatically if the door is opened by the user. By forcing the user to close the microwave door while it is in use, it becomes impossible for the user to error by leaving the door open. Forcing functions are very effective in safety critical situations such as this, but can cause confusion in more complex systems that do not inform the user of the error that has been made.

== History ==
The term poka-yoke was applied by Shigeo Shingo in the 1960s to industrial processes designed to prevent human errors. Shingo redesigned a process in which factory workers, while assembling a small switch, would often forget to insert the required spring under one of the switch buttons. In the redesigned process, the worker would perform the task in two steps, first preparing the two required springs and placing them in a placeholder, then inserting the springs from the placeholder into the switch. When a spring remained in the placeholder, the workers knew that they had forgotten to insert it and could correct the mistake effortlessly.

Shingo distinguished between the concepts of inevitable human mistakes and defects in the production. Defects occur when the mistakes are allowed to reach the customer. The aim of poka-yoke is to design the process so that mistakes can be detected and corrected immediately, eliminating defects at the source.

== Implementation in manufacturing ==
Poka-yoke can be implemented at any step of a manufacturing process where something can go wrong or an error can be made. For example, a fixture that holds pieces for processing might be modified to only allow pieces to be held in the correct orientation, or a digital counter might track the number of spot welds on each piece to ensure that the worker executes the correct number of welds.

Shingo recognized three types of poka-yoke for detecting and preventing errors in a mass production system:

1. The contact method identifies product defects by testing the product's shape, size, color, or other physical attributes.
2. The fixed-value (or constant number) method alerts the operator if a certain number of movements are not made.
3. The motion-step (or sequence) method determines whether the prescribed steps of the process have been followed.

Either the operator is alerted when a mistake is about to be made, or the poka-yoke device actually prevents the mistake from being made. In Shingo's lexicon, the former implementation would be called a warning poka-yoke, while the latter would be referred to as a control poka-yoke.

Shingo argued that errors are inevitable in any manufacturing process, but that if appropriate poka-yokes are implemented, then mistakes can be caught quickly and prevented from resulting in defects. By eliminating defects at the source, the cost of mistakes within a company is reduced.

== Benefits of poka-yoke implementation ==
A typical feature of poka-yoke solutions is that they don't let an error in a process happen. Other advantages include:

- Less time spent on training workers;
- Elimination of many operations related to quality control;
- Unburdening of operators from repetitive operations;
- Promotion of the work improvement-oriented approach and actions;
- A reduced number of rejects;
- Immediate action when a problem occurs;
- 100% built-in quality control;
- Preventing bad products from reaching customers;
- Detecting mistakes as they occur;
- Eliminating defects before they occur.

== See also ==
- Defensive design
- Fail-safe
- Idiot-proof
- Interlock
- Murphy's law
- Pointing and calling
