= Sod's law =

British culture axiom

Sod's law is a British culture axiom that states that "if something can go wrong, it will". The law sometimes has a corollary: that the misfortune will happen at "the worst possible time" (Finagle's law). The term is commonly used in the United Kingdom (while in many parts of North America the phrase "Murphy's law" is more popular).

The phrase seems to derive, at least in part, from the colloquialism an "unlucky sod"; a term for someone who has had some bad (unlucky) experience, and is usually used as a sympathetic reference to the person.

A slightly different form of Sod's law states that "the degree of failure is in direct proportion to the effort expended and to the need for success."

An alternative expression, again in British culture, is "hope for the best, expect the worst".

== Comparison with Murphy's law ==
Sod's law is a more extreme version of Murphy's law. While Murphy's law says that anything that can go wrong, will go wrong (eventually), Sod's law requires that it will always go wrong with the worst possible outcome or at the worst time. Belief in Sod's law can be viewed as a combination of the law of truly large numbers and the psychological effect of the law of selection. The former says we should expect things to go wrong now and then, and the latter says the exceptional events where something went wrong stand out in memory, but the great number of mundane events where nothing exceptional happened fall into obscurity. Sod’s law is also explained as a form of the natural human negativity bias, the survival trait of being extra alert to negative events.

== Examples ==
Some examples are traffic lights turning red when a driver is in a hurry, or email software crashing at the exact moment the user attempts to send an important message. Sod's law has also been applied to individuals, such as the composer Beethoven losing his hearing or Def Leppard drummer Rick Allen losing an arm in a car crash.

Other examples are dropped bread always landing butter side down, or it raining just after one has washed the car and on the weekend one goes to the beach.

A discrediting example is a coin toss resulting in tails the more strongly that one wishes the result to be heads. Richard Dawkins said that this shows the idea of Sod's law is "nonsense", as the coin is unaware of the person's wish and has no desire to thwart it.

== See also ==
- Finagle's law
- Buttered toast phenomenon
- Depressive realism
- Defensive pessimism
- Negative visualization
