= Picture Day =

Picture Day can refer to:

- Picture Day (school day), the day students are photographed
- Picture Day (film), a 2012 film
- "Picture Day" (Dexter's Laboratory), a 1997 television episode segment
- "Picture Day" (Lizzie McGuire), a 2001 television episode
- "Picture Day" (Milo Murphy's Law), a 2019 television episode segment
- "Picture Day" (Odd Squad), a 2014 television episode segment
- "Picture Day" (SpongeBob SquarePants), a 2007 television episode segment
- "Picture Day" (Alexa & Katie), a 2018 television episode
