= Richard Zeckhauser =

American economist (born 1940)

Richard J. Zeckhauser
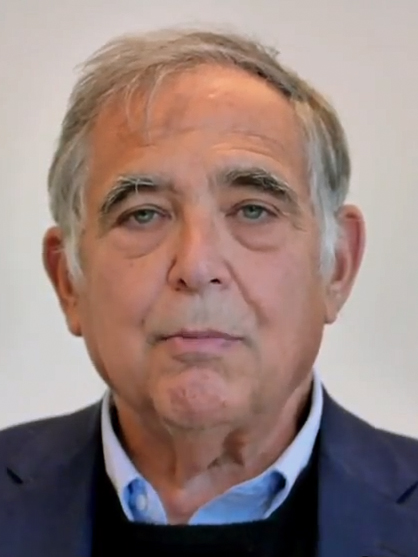
- Zeckhauser in 2014
- Born: 1940 (age 85–86)
- Spouse: Sally H. Zeckhauser

Academic background
- Education: Harvard University (BA, PhD)
- Influences: Thomas Schelling

Academic work
- Discipline: Decision theory, game theory, behavioral economics
- School or tradition: Decision theory, behavioral economics
- Institutions: Harvard University
- Doctoral students: Nat Keohane, Gernot Wagner
- Website: Information at IDEAS / RePEc

Richard Jay Zeckhauser (born 1940) is an American economist and the Frank P. Ramsey Professor of Political Economy at Harvard Kennedy School at Harvard University.

== Life ==
Zeckhauser holds a B.A., summa cum laude, and a Ph.D. in economics from Harvard University. Early in his career, he was one of the "whiz kids" assembled by Defense Secretary Robert S. McNamara to apply cutting-edge analysis to Cold War military strategy. He is married to Sally H. Zeckhauser.

He is the author or co-author of many books and over 300 peer-reviewed articles. His most significant works focus on risk management, decision sciences, investment, and policy-making under uncertainty. Zeckhauser introduced the term "ignorance" into decision-making under uncertainty, as in: there's "risk", "uncertainty", and outright "ignorance".

His most recent book, with Peter Schuck, is Targeting in Social Programs. The book examines how and why to deploy scarce public resources to solve public problems. While he holds no formal office, he has long been an informal leader at Harvard Kennedy School and at Harvard. He was also an affiliated expert at Analysis Group. In 1994, he was elected to the Common Cause National Governing Board.

== Bridge career ==
Zeckhauser is a champion bridge player.

=== Wins ===
- North American Bridge Championships (2)
  - Blue Ribbon Pairs (1) 1966
  - Mixed Pairs (1) 2007

=== Runners-up ===
- North American Bridge Championships (2)
  - Men's Board-a-Match Teams (1) 1968
  - Mixed Board-a-Match Teams (2) 2003, 2012

== Significant works ==
- Summers, Lawrence, and Richard Zeckhauser. "Policymaking for posterity." Journal of Risk and Uncertainty 37.2–3 (2008): 115–140.
- Zeckhauser, Richard. "Investing in the Unknown and Unknowable." (2010): 77–117.
- Samuelson, William, and Richard Zeckhauser. "Status quo bias in decision making." Journal of risk and uncertainty 1, no. 1 (1988): 7–59.
- Zeckhauser, Richard (2006) "Investing in the Unknown and Unknowable", Capitalism and Society: Vol. 1 : Iss. 2, Article 5. doi:10.2202/1932-0213.1009
- Schuck, Peter H. & Zeckhauser, Richard J. Targeting in Social Programs: Avoiding Bad Bets, Removing Bad Apples, Brookings Institution Press, 2010, ISBN 978-0815704287
- Zeckhauser, Richard, Strategy and choice, MIT Press, 1991, ISBN 978-0262240338
- Zeckhauser, Richard, Keeney, Ralph L., Sebenius, James K. Wise choices: decisions, games, and negotiations, Harvard Business Press, 1996, ISBN 978-0875846774
- Zeckhauser, Richard (2008). "Insurance". In David R. Henderson (ed.). Concise Encyclopedia of Economics (2nd ed.). Indianapolis: Library of Economics and Liberty. pp. 281–284. ISBN 978-0865976658. OCLC 23779426.

== Trivia ==
Zeckhauser is connected to the so-called Yhprum's law, the opposite of Murphy's law, saying: "Sometimes systems that should not work, work nevertheless."
