= List of Milo Murphy's Law episodes =

Milo Murphy's Law is an American animated television series from the creators of Phineas and Ferb, Dan Povenmire and Jeff "Swampy" Marsh, which premiered on October 3, 2016. The series revolves around the title character, Milo Murphy, who is a descendant of Edward A. Murphy Jr., the namesake of Murphy's law, which states that anything that can go wrong will go wrong. During the course of the series, 40 episodes of Milo Murphy's Law aired over two seasons, between October 3, 2016, and May 18, 2019.

== Series overview ==
Season	Segments	Episodes	Originally released		
Season	Segments	Episodes	First released	Last released	Network
1	36	20	October 3, 2016	December 2, 2017	Disney XD
2	37	20	January 5, 2019	May 18, 2019	Disney Channel

== Episodes ==
=== Season 1 (2016–17) ===
No. overall	No. in season	Title	Directed by	Written by	Storyboard by	Original release date	Prod. code	U.S. viewers (millions)
1a	1a	"Going the Extra Milo"	Dan Povenmire & Robert F. Hughes	Story by : Dan Povenmire & Jeff "Swampy" Marsh; Written by : Dan Povenmire & Kyle Menke	Dan Povenmire & Kyle Menke	October 3, 2016 (Note: Prior to the television premiere, this episode was released on iTunes and Amazon on September 19, 2016. It was also released on Watch Disney XD and Video on Demand on September 26, 2016.)	101a	0.33
Zack Underwood, a newcomer to the tri-state area, meets Milo Murphy, the unluckiest kid in town due to Murphy's Law. Because of Milo's misfortune, he and Zack both miss the bus for school, so the former shows the latter a "shortcut"; all the while attempting to avoid wolves, bees, fire, and even an alien abduction. Meanwhile, Melissa Chase, a friend of Milo's, bets lunches from other students on whether or not Milo and Zack will make it to school before the bell rings.
1b	1b	"The Undergrounders"	Bob Bowen	Dani Vetere	Steven Umbleby	October 10, 2016	101b	0.26
Milo, Zack, and Melissa's subway car gets derailed on their way to a field trip to the museum. While trying to find their way back, they encounter a society of construction workers who have been trapped underground for a long time.
2a	2a	"Rooting for the Enemy"	Robert F. Hughes	Scott Peterson	Chris Ybarra	October 10, 2016	102a	0.26
Milo is allowed to attend his first school football game since the home team, the Geckos, will lose anyway. However, he discovers a way he can help them win.
2b	2b	"Sunny Side Up"	Robert F. Hughes	Dan Povenmire & Kyle Menke	Edward Rivera & Kyle Menke	October 3, 2016	102b	0.33
After science teacher Mrs. Murawski, announces a science project, Milo, Zack, and Melissa must overcome Murphy's Law to protect an egg and their grades.
3a	3a	"The Doctor Zone Files"	Bob Bowen	Joshua Pruett	Jacob Hair	October 17, 2016	103a	0.35
Milo and his sister, Sara, who are huge fans of the science-fiction television series The Doctor Zone Files, take "newbies" Zack and Melissa along with them to see the new Doctor Zone movie. However, Sara is hardly taking any chances with the effects of Murphy's law. Guest star: Jemaine Clement as Doctor Zone
3b	3b	"The Note"	Robert F. Hughes	Story by : Scott Peterson; Written by : Jim Bernstein	Ashley Michelle Simpson	October 17, 2016	103b	0.35
Milo loses his doctor's note excusing his class absences due to Murphy's law, so he, Zack, and Melissa attempt to retrieve it.
4a	4a	"Party of Peril"	Bob Bowen	Martin Olson	Calvin Suggs	October 26, 2016 (Note: This episode premiered on Disney Channel prior to Disney XD. The episode premiered on Disney XD on October 27, 2016.)	104a	0.80
The other school kids, led by Melissa and Zack, throw a surprise birthday party for Milo at a go-kart track.
4b	4b	"Smooth Opera-tor"	Robert F. Hughes	Dani Vetere	Edward Rivera	October 26, 2016	104b	0.80
Zack, Melissa, and Milo attend an opera performance with fellow classmate Amanda, but Milo accidentally ends up backstage and attempts to prevent havoc from occurring.
5a	5a	"Worked Day"	Robert F. Hughes	Joshua Pruett	Ashley Michelle Simpson	October 27, 2016 (Note: This episode premiered on Disney Channel prior to Disney XD. The episode premiered on Disney XD on October 28, 2016.)	105a	0.97
On career day, Milo struggles to decide what his career should be. He visits the water works, fire department, and hospital, but everything goes wrong. Meanwhile, time travelers Vinnie Dakota and Balthazar Cavendish try and make sure a truck full of pistachios makes it to a pistachio warehouse.
5b	5b	"The Wilder West"	Bob Bowen	Dani Vetere	Jacob Hair	October 27, 2016	105b	0.97
While Milo and his friends are visiting a dude ranch, they meet a girl named Jackie, and Zack becomes smitten with her. However, she leads them into more danger than usual. Meanwhile, Sara is going crazy because the ranch reminds her of scenes from The Doctor Zone Files and invites other fans to join in the geek fest. Guest star: Ariel Winter as Jackie
6a	6a	"Family Vacation"	Bob Bowen	Joshua Pruett	Steven Umbleby	March 6, 2017	106a	0.21
The Murphys go on vacation to nowhere in particular, but at a rest stop, Milo accidentally gets on the wrong RV with a different family.
6b	6b	"Murphy's Lard"	Robert F. Hughes	Martin Olson	Chris Ybarra	March 7, 2017	106b	0.17
At Lard World, Milo and Zack help Melissa overcome her fear of roller coasters, which stemmed from a roller coaster landing in her backyard. Meanwhile, Dakota and Cavendish attempt to protect the amusement park's pistachio stand. Guest star: Thomas Lennon as Henry
7a	7a	"Secrets and Pies"	Robert F. Hughes	Joshua Pruett	Chris Ybarra	March 8, 2017	107a	0.17
After Milo's attempt to cook mac and cheese ends in disaster, he decides to order pizza. While waiting for it to arrive, he and his friends decide to share some secrets, during which Zack reveals he was in a lumberjack-themed boy band. Guest star: Danica McKellar as Veronica
7b	7b	"Athledecamathalon"	Bob Bowen	Jim Bernstein	Calvin Suggs	March 9, 2017	107b	0.19
Due to budget cuts, the school has to combine the academic decathlon with the athletic decathlon. Meanwhile, Mr. and Mrs. Murphy visit the school in search of the former's soccer trophy.
8a	8a	"The Substitute"	Robert F. Hughes	Jim Bernstein	Edward Rivera	March 13, 2017	108a	0.14
Milo's science class deals with a burnt-out substitute. Meanwhile, Cavendish and Dakota end up in the classroom's closet while trying to help a nearby pistachio tree grow. Guest star: Leah Remini as Ms. Baxter
8b	8b	"Time Out"	Robert F. Hughes	Scott Peterson	Edward Rivera	March 14, 2017	108b	N/A
Milo and Zack go fishing with their dads. Meanwhile, when their phone battery dies, Cavendish and Dakota interfere with fellow time agents, Brick and Savannah's, time travel mission.
9a	9a	"We're Going to the Zoo"	Bob Bowen	Martin Olson	Steven Umbleby	March 15, 2017	109a	0.18
At a donation drive, Milo accidentally gives away his mother's vintage T-shirts. Meanwhile, Cavendish and Dakota are assigned to protect pistachios at the zoo.
9b	9b	"School Dance"	Bob Bowen	Dani Vetere	Ashley Michelle Simpson	March 16, 2017	109b	N/A
Amanda does everything she can to make sure the school dance goes off without a hitch. Meanwhile, Cavendish and Dakota go to the dance to attempt to prove that Milo is a counter-agent attempting to thwart their plans, but Milo's classmate Chad mistakes them for vampire hunters.
10a	10a	"Battle of the Bands"	Bob Bowen	Dani Vetere	Joseph S. Scott	March 20, 2017	110a	N/A
Milo, Melissa, Zack, and their classmate Mort's band enters the battle of the bands, where Zack discovers his old boy band is competing. Guest star: Slash as himself
10b	10b	"The Math Book"	Bob Bowen	Dani Vetere	Joseph S. Scott	March 21, 2017	110b	N/A
Milo, Zack, and Melissa go to school after sunset to retrieve her math book. Unfortunately, she leaves the spare key inside the locked classroom, so the three go on a "quest" in search of the mysterious janitor, otherwise known as the "key-keeper".
11a	11a	"The Little Engine That Couldn't"	Robert F. Hughes	Joshua Pruett	Calvin Suggs	March 22, 2017	111a	N/A
When Melissa's firefighter dad drives her and Milo into town in a decommissioned old fire engine, chaos ensues.
11b	11b	"The Llama Incident"	Robert F. Hughes	Dani Vetere, Jim Bernstein & Martin Olson	Calvin Suggs	March 23, 2017	111b	0.18
Milo and Melissa finally tell Zack the story of the infamous "llama incident" they keep referring to.
12	12	"Missing Milo" (Note: This episode is a one-hour special.)	Bob Bowen & Robert F. Hughes	Scott Peterson & Joshua Pruett	Edward Rivera, Ashley Michelle Simpson, Steven Umbleby & Chris Ybarra	July 22, 2017	113-114	0.16
Cavendish and Dakota travel with Milo to the year 2175, causing Zack and Melissa to lose him and encounter pistachio monsters. Guest star: Rhys Darby as King Pistachion
13a	13a	"Star Struck"	Robert F. Hughes	Jim Bernstein	Chris Ybarra	September 25, 2017	112a	0.17
Milo learns that his favorite actor, Tobias Trollhammer, is currently shooting a film in town, so he decides to travel to the set to get his autograph.
13b	13b	"Disaster of My Dreams"	Bob Bowen	Martin Olson	Steven Umbleby	September 25, 2017	112b	0.17
School crossing guard Elliot Decker becomes the school's head safety monitor and quickly uses his power to stop Milo.
14a	14a	"A Clockwork Origin"	Bob Bowen	Jim Bernstein	Joseph S. Scott	September 26, 2017	115a	N/A
Milo, Zack, and Melissa set out in search of a missing robot that previously escaped. Guest stars: Joel McHale as Victor, Barry Bostwick as Clyde
14b	14b	"Perchance to Sleepwalk"	Robert F. Hughes	Martin Olson & Scott Peterson	Diana Huh	September 26, 2017	115b	N/A
While camping with Zack and Melissa, Milo begins to sleepwalk through the nearby woods. Meanwhile, Cavendish and Dakota have a "ditch day" from pistachio duties following their ordeal with the Pistachions.
15a	15a	"Some Like It Yacht"	Robert F. Hughes	Jim Bernstein	Chris Ybarra	September 27, 2017	117a	0.14
The students embark on a special trip while using the school's yacht.
15b	15b	"Backward to School Night"	Bob Bowen	Joshua Pruett	Steven Umbleby	September 27, 2017	117b	0.14
During a "Back to School Night" event, the parents suddenly become children due to Dakota's stolen time device.
16a	16a	"World Without Milo"	Robert F. Hughes	Scott Peterson	Joseph S. Scott	September 28, 2017	118a	N/A
One morning, Elliot wakes up to discover that Milo no longer exists. At first, he is overjoyed, but soon becomes bored.
16b	16b	"The Race"	Bob Bowen	Dani Vetere	Diana Huh	September 28, 2017	118b	N/A
Milo participates in a race and relies on Melissa and Zack to throw him reinforcements from his backpack to finish it. Meanwhile, Cavendish and Dakota, while attempting to stop the re-assigned Brick and Savannah from saving pistachios, find themselves in the Old West and meet Milo's great-great grandfather, Sheriff Murphy.
17a	17a	"Love Toboggan"	Bob Bowen	Dani Vetere	Chris Ybarra	September 29, 2017	120a	N/A
Sara contemplates whether or not she is on a date with Neal from the comic book store. Meanwhile, Milo, Zack, Melissa, and Mr. Murphy go to the skiing slope, but the kids' toboggan goes out of control. Guest star: Maulik Pancholy as Neal
17b	17b	"The Island of Lost Dakotas"	Bob Bowen	Joshua Pruett	Steve Umbleby & Chris Ybarra	September 29, 2017	120b	N/A
Cavendish keeps dying, forcing Dakota to repeatedly make time paradox duplicate versions of himself to save him and send them off to an island. Meanwhile, Milo, Zack, and Melissa go to see "Hamosaur 2", but Milo has trouble finding his shoes. Guest star: Jack McBrayer as Ship Captain
18	18	"Fungus Among Us" (Note: This episode is a half-hour special. It was also intended to be the season one finale. However, the Halloween and Christmas specials aired afterwards.)	Robert F. Hughes	Scott Peterson & Joshua Pruett	Joseph S. Scott, Diana Huh, Chris Ybarra & Kyle Menke	September 30, 2017	121	N/A
Milo, Cavendish, and Dakota travel to 1965 to help Orton Mahlson create The Doctor Zone Files. Unfortunately, they find that Derek, the son of King Pistachion, has somehow survived and body snatched everyone in the tri-state area over the course of several decades. While seeking the help of the inventor of time travel, they discover their only hope lies in an incompetent pharmacist.
19	19	"Milo's Halloween Scream-a-Torium" (Note: This episode is a half-hour special.)	Robert F. Hughes	Jim Bernstein, Martin Olson, Scott Peterson, Joshua Pruett & Dani Vetere	Edward Rivera & Ashley Michelle Simpson	October 7, 2017	119	0.23
Milo builds his own haunted house out of a decommissioned truck and invites his friends to the fright fest, but Zack is not too amused because he has grown out of being scared on Halloween. Thanks to Murphy's Law and the truck going on a wild ride throughout town however, Zack slowly changes his mind. Meanwhile, Dakota and Cavendish take part in the Halloween fun while also investigating the mystery of the last Halloween, which almost happens because of Dakota and a wayward time grenade.
20	20	"A Christmas Peril"	Bob Bowen	Joshua Pruett & Dani Vetere	Edward Rivera & Ashley Michelle Simpson	December 2, 2017	116	0.30
Sara, Milo, Melissa, and Zack bring the Murphy family together for Christmas. Meanwhile, in the future, an older Cavendish and Dakota attempt to repair their broken friendship.

=== Season 2 (2019) ===
No. overall	No. in season	Title	Directed by	Written by	Storyboard by	Original release date	Prod. code	U.S. viewers (millions)
21	1	"The Phineas and Ferb Effect"	Bob Bowen & Robert F. Hughes	Story by : Jim Bernstein, Martin Olson, Scott Peterson, Joshua Pruett & Dani Vetere; Written by : Jim Bernstein, Martin Olson, Scott Peterson & Joshua Pruett	Lauren Andrews, Jacob Hair, Kyle Menke, Steven Umbleby & Chris Ybarra	January 5, 2019 (Note: This episode first premiered in: Japan on August 10, 2018; Germany, Italy, Poland, Sub-Saharan Africa, Spain, and the UK on September 10, 2018; Also, in the United States, this episode premiered on both Disney Channel and Disney XD simultaneously.)	201	0.68
Following the events of "Fungus Among Us", Milo, Zack, Melissa, Cavendish, and Dakota — with help from new friends Phineas Flynn, Ferb Fletcher, Candace Flynn, Buford van Stomm, Baljeet Tjinder, and Dr. Heinz Doofenshmirtz — conquer Murphy's law to stop a swarm of Pistachions. Guest star: Rhys Darby as King Pistachion, Vincent Martella as Phineas Flynn, Ashley Tisdale as Candace Flynn, David Errigo Jr. as Ferb Fletcher, Bobby Gaylor as Buford Van Stomm, Maulik Pancholy as Baljeet Tjinder, Dan Povenmire as Dr. Heinz Doofenshmirtz, Dee Bradley Baker as Perry the Platypus
22a	2a	"Snow Way Out"	Robert F. Hughes	Martin Olson & Scott Peterson	Ashley Michelle Simpson	January 12, 2019 (Note: This episode first premiered in: Germany, Italy, Poland, Spain, and the UK on September 11, 2018; India on November 5, 2018; Japan on December 16, 2018; Also, beginning with this episode, new episodes in the United States premiere on Disney Channel prior to Disney XD.)	N/A	0.39
In a similar vein as "Going the Extra Milo", Milo and Zack attempt to survive Murphy's law while getting to school on a cold winter day while Bradley and Melissa bet on whether they will make it on time again. Meanwhile, Cavendish and Dakota are forced to stand before the Time Council for their constant failures, resulting in their being fired and having their ability to time travel revoked.
22b	2b	"Teacher Feature"	Bob Bowen	Scott Peterson	James Kim	January 12, 2019	N/A	0.39
After Scott the Undergrounder and Mrs. Murawski appear to hit it off and set up a date, Milo and the gang attempt to help the former look more presentable and normal.
23a	3a	"Picture Day"	Robert F. Hughes	Valerie Breiman & Marja Adriance	Chris Ybarra	January 19, 2019 (Note: This episode first premiered in: Germany, Italy, Poland, Spain, and the UK on September 12, 2018; India on November 6, 2018; Japan on December 23, 2018)	N/A	0.42
Melissa and Zack become determined to get a good picture of Milo for school Picture Day after learning he has never had a good one, but Chad misinterprets this as Milo being a vampire and recruits Mort to help him prove it. Meanwhile, Cavendish and Dakota get new jobs at the Paranormal Investigation Group (P.I.G.) and try to capture a Yeti on camera to impress their new boss, Mr. Block.
23b	3b	"Agee Ientee Diogee"	Bob Bowen	Jim Bernstein	Steve Umbleby	January 19, 2019	N/A	0.42
After moving in with the Murphy family, Doofenshmirtz reminisces on an adventure he had with Milo's pet dog, Diogee, the previous summer after the canine got caught up in a secret agent mission.
24a	4a	"Game Night"	Robert F. Hughes	Joshua Pruett	Joseph S. Scott	January 26, 2019 (Note: This episode first premiered in: Germany, Italy, Poland, Spain, and the UK on September 13, 2018; India on November 7, 2018; Japan on January 6, 2019)	204a	0.40
Milo and his friends and family decide to finally finish a board game even in spite of Murphy's Law.
24b	4b	"Pace Makes Waste"	Bob Bowen	Jim Bernstein	Lauren Andrews	January 26, 2019	204b	0.40
Milo and Elliot become the pace car drivers for a charity race. Guest stars: Rusty Wallace, Joey Logano, Ty Dillon, Ricky Stenhouse Jr., Erik Jones, William Byron, and Mike Joy as themselves
25a	5a	"Cake 'Splosion!"	Robert F. Hughes	Valerie Breiman & Marja Adriance	Ashley Michelle Simpson	February 2, 2019 (Note: This episode first premiered in: Germany, Italy, Poland, Spain, and the UK on September 14, 2018; India on November 8, 2018; Japan on January 13, 2019)	N/A	0.39
Milo and Amanda get the chance to be on the latter's favorite TV show, Cake 'Splosion!, an extreme kids' cooking show.
25b	5b	"Lady Krillers"	Bob Bowen	Scott Peterson	James Kim	February 2, 2019 (Note: This episode first premiered in: India on November 8, 2018; Japan on January 13, 2019)	N/A	0.39
Hollywood is rebooting the first Krillhunter movie with all women, so Milo and the gang help Trollhammer audition as a woman. Meanwhile, Cavendish and Dakota try to catch an alien while picking up trash by the highway.
26a	6a	"Doof's Day Out"	Robert F. Hughes	Valerie Breiman & Marja Adriance	Chris Ybarra	February 9, 2019 (Note: This episode first premiered in: Germany, Italy, Poland, Spain, and the UK on September 18, 2018; India on November 12, 2018)	N/A	0.32
Sara starts to go insane from Doofenshmirtz constantly invading her personal space, so he goes out with the rest of the Murphy family to try new things.
26b	6b	"Disco Do-Over"	Bob Bowen	Valerie Breiman & Marja Adriance	Steve Umbleby	February 9, 2019	N/A	0.32
Learning that the local skating rink is closing down, Milo convinces his parents to pursue their dream of winning a disco skating competition they were unable to finish years ago before that happens. Elsewhere, Cavendish and Dakota are assigned to pick up seemingly ordinary lawn gnomes from a little old lady.
27a	7a	"The Ticking Clock"	Robert F. Hughes	Jim Bernstein	Rachel Buecheler	February 16, 2019 (Note: This episode first premiered in: Germany, Italy, Poland, Spain, and the UK on September 17, 2018; India on November 9, 2018; Japan on January 20, 2019)	207a	0.35
Milo and his friends try to save the old clock at City Hall that Melissa's great-grandmother designed. Meanwhile, Doof tries to help the city by removing sidewalk gum under Agent P's supervision.
27b	7b	"Managing Murphy's Law"	Bob Bowen	Joshua Pruett	Lauren Andrews	February 16, 2019	207b	0.35
Amanda helps Milo, Zack, Melissa, and Mort prepare for an afternoon concert while aliens try to covertly study Milo. Elsewhere, Cavendish and Dakota find themselves losing time and not remembering why.
28a	8a	"Milo's Shadow"	Robert F. Hughes	Scott Peterson	Chris Ybarra	February 23, 2019 (Note: This episode first premiered in: Germany, Italy, Poland, Spain, and the UK on September 20, 2018; India on November 14, 2018)	209a	0.37
Doof shadows Milo to see how he navigates around Murphy's Law. Meanwhile, Cavendish joins an extraterrestrial conspiracy support group.
28b	8b	"Sick Day"	Bob Bowen	Joshua Pruett	Steve Umbleby	February 23, 2019	209b	0.37
While Milo is sick, two shapeshifting aliens attempt to get a tissue sample from him. Meanwhile, under Major Monogram's orders, Agent P continues to keep Doof from doing harm while attempting to do good. When Doof founds out however, he feels betrayed and renounces their friendship.
29a	9a	"Field of Screams"	Robert F. Hughes	Martin Olson	Ashley Michelle Simpson	March 2, 2019 (Note: This episode first premiered in: Germany, Italy, Poland, Spain, and the UK on September 19, 2018; India on November 13, 2018)	N/A	0.33
When his Uncle Cornelius asks for help on his farm, Zack tries to prove to a doubtful Milo and Melissa that a "city boy" like him can handle the job. Meanwhile, on a nearby farm, Cavendish and Dakota are assigned to pick up a fallen UFO piece from a farmer who wants to become famous in the tabloids.
29b	9b	"Spy Little Sister!"	Bob Bowen	Valerie Breiman & Marja Adriance	James Kim	March 2, 2019	N/A	0.33
While heading to a mentor program she does not want to be a part of, Melissa ends up paired with Savannah on a mission to stop a rampaging robot that Milo and Zack accidentally built at the science fair before it destroys half of Danville.
30a	10a	"Dog Walker, Runner, Screamer"	Robert F. Hughes	Valerie Breiman & Marja Adriance	Ashley Michelle Simpson	March 9, 2019 (Note: This episode first premiered in India on November 16, 2018.)	N/A	0.38
Elliott gets hurt because of a Murphy's Law related incident, so Milo helps him with his second job as a dog walker. Meanwhile, Cavendish and Dakota discover an alien anti-gravity device and try to show it to Mr. Block for a promotion.
30b	10b	"Now I Am a Murphy"	Robert F. Hughes	Jim Bernstein	James Kim	March 9, 2019	N/A	0.38
After discovering a boombox in the attic, Milo, Mr. Murphy, and Grandpa Murphy go camping so Milo can undergo a family rite of passage to become a "Murphy Man" all while contending with a killer cyborg bear. Meanwhile, with the men away, the Murphy women and Doof go to an art museum to celebrate the day without Murphy's Law, but Doof causes chaos in its place.
31a	11a	"Freefall"	Robert F. Hughes	Story by : Joshua Pruett & Dani Vetere; Written by : Joshua Pruett	Rachel Buecheler	March 16, 2019 (Note: This episode first premiered in: Spain on September 21, 2018; India on November 15, 2018)	N/A	0.32
After an incident with a skydiving simulator, Milo, Melissa, and Zack are left in a cycle of falling and rising through the sky while Diogee tries to save them. Meanwhile, Cavendish and Dakota accidentally gain rivals in the form of government agents Colonel Niblet and Lieutenant Tenant after unknowingly taking the blame for Milo and his friends destroying one of their facilities.
31b	11b	"Milo's World"	Bob Bowen	Joshua Pruett	Lauren Andrews	March 16, 2019	N/A	0.32
While waiting for Milo to come join them for lunch, Melissa, Zack, Bradley, Mort, Chad, and Sara present "Neal From the Comic Shop" with differing theories on what Milo really is; ranging from him being a wizard, a supervillain, and a robot.
32	12	"Abducting Murphy's Law"	Bob Bowen	Joshua Pruett	Steven Umbleby & Chris Ybarra	March 23, 2019 (Note: This episode first premiered in India on November 20, 2018.)	212	0.32
Milo gets abducted by the shapeshifting aliens, so Melissa, Zack, and Doof attempt to look for him. While on trash duty, Cavendish sees the abduction from a distance, but Dakota does not, leading to an argument that ends in the dissolution of their partnership and Cavendish going rogue.
33a	13a	"The Goulash Legacy"	Robert F. Hughes	Martin Olson & Joshua Pruett	Rachel Buecheler	March 30, 2019 (Note: This episode first premiered in India on November 21, 2018.)	N/A	0.37
Eons in the future, an elderly man tells his grandson how a sentient crockpot of goulash came to be and defeated an army of robot screech owls. Meanwhile in the present, Milo, his friends, and Doof attempt to protect Mrs. Murphy's goulash from Murphy's Law and Doof's hand-held-inators.
33b	13b	"The Dog Who Knew Too Much"	Bob Bowen	Joshua Pruett, Valerie Breiman & Marja Adriance	Lauren Andrews	March 30, 2019	N/A	0.37
After being told to go home again, Diogee crosses paths with Agent P and enemy agents after he swallows a flash drive disguised as a cookie. Meanwhile, Mrs. Murphy makes Doof and Sara pick up dirty clothes, so the former builds a robot hamper-inator to do the job for them.
34a	14a	"Adventure Buddies"	Robert F. Hughes	Martin Olson	Ashley Michelle Simpson	April 6, 2019 (Note: This episode first premiered in India on November 22, 2018.)	N/A	0.43
Doof becomes inspired to find an "adventure buddy" to get over Agent P, and winds up joining Scott on a boat ride through the sewers.
34b	14b	"Ride Along Little Doggie"	Bob Bowen	Valerie Breiman & Marja Adriance	Steven Umbleby	April 6, 2019	N/A	0.43
While attending a school award ceremony, Milo attempts to get to the stage in time to collect an award he was nominated for. Meanwhile, Diogee ends up riding along with two of Danville's police officers while they attempt to catch Zippy, the world's fastest koala, and rescue one of their K-9 officers.
35a	15a	"Look At This Ship"	Robert F. Hughes	Scott Peterson	Chris Ybarra	April 13, 2019 (Note: This episode first premiered in Spain on February 15, 2019.)	N/A	0.33
Milo attempts to escape his room so he can go out for the day with Zack and Melissa. Elsewhere, Dakota teams up with Doof to find Cavendish, who is attempting to show various news outlets a crashed U.F.O. with a malfunctioning cloaking device.
35b	15b	"Cast Party"	Bob Bowen	Valerie Breiman & Marja Adriance	James Kim	April 13, 2019	N/A	0.33
After Zack breaks his leg while doing interpretive dance, all of his friends plan a "cast party". At said party, everyone shares stories of how they all broke something without Milo, Mr. Murphy, or Murphy's Law around as far as they know.
36a	16a	"Safety First"	Robert F. Hughes	Jim Bernstein	Rachel Buecheler	April 20, 2019	N/A	0.35
Milo and Elliot accidentally get handcuffed together. Meanwhile, Zack and Melissa attempt to make a student film, but Doof messes everything up.
36b	16b	"Cavendish Unleashed"	Bob Bowen	Martin Olson	Ron Rubio	April 20, 2019	N/A	0.35
Milo, Zack, and Melissa attend a camp to learn new skills. Elsewhere, Cavendish inadvertently unleashes a giant alien. When he learns the shapeshifting aliens are coming back for Milo, he winds up being frozen before he can warn him.
37a	17a	"First Impressions"	Robert F. Hughes	Joshua Pruett	Ashley Michelle Simpson	April 27, 2019	217a	0.35
Six-year-olds Milo and Melissa meet for the first time, and Murphy's Law makes their first day of 1st grade a big adventure. Meanwhile, Dakota relates to Doof how he first met Cavendish while training to become time agents.
37b	17b	"The Speech and Debate League of Death and Destruction Cross Town Explosion Event"	Bob Bowen	Joshua Pruett	James Kim & Rebecca Wallace	April 27, 2019	217b	0.35
Zack and Milo join Melissa's athletically minded wrestling, speech, and debate team.
38a	18a	"The Mid-Afternoon Snack Club"	Robert F. Hughes	Jim Bernstein	Chris Ybarra	May 4, 2019	N/A	0.35
Milo, Melissa, Zack, Mort, Bradley, and Amanda get in trouble with a substitute teacher and get detention. Meanwhile, the killer cyborg bear returns to track down Milo and get revenge on him.
38b	18b	"Parks and Wreck"	Bob Bowen	Valerie Breiman & Marja Adriance	Steven Umbleby	May 4, 2019	N/A	0.35
After the school football field gets ruined, an event that was meant to be held there gets transferred to an old dilapidated park, where Melissa and Amanda compete over who can fix it up faster. Meanwhile, Dakota and Doof deal with an alien device that turns bones into a noodle-like substance.
39a	19a	"Escape"	Robert F. Hughes	Story by : Joshua Pruett; Written by : Scott Peterson	Rachel Buecheler	May 11, 2019	N/A	0.39
Milo, his classmate Lydia, Coach Mitchell, and Scott get stuck in a mall elevator. Meanwhile, Doof and Dakota search for Cavendish with the help of a "Cavenpus" clone made from Cavendish and Agent P's DNA.
39b	19b	"Milo in Space"	Bob Bowen	Scott Peterson & Joshua Pruett	Ron Rubio	May 11, 2019	N/A	0.39
Milo and the gang, now joined by a revived Cavendish, Agent P, and the "Cavenpus" arrive at the grounded UFO, only for the shapeshifting aliens to abduct Milo once again.
40	20	"Sphere and Loathing in Outer Space"	Robert F. Hughes	Jim Bernstein, Martin Olson, Scott Peterson, Joshua Pruett, Valerie Breiman & Marja Adriance	James Kim, Kyle Menke, Ashley Michelle Simpson, Rebecca Wallace & Chris Ybarra	May 18, 2019	220	0.46
Milo is brought to an alien planet to face down a cosmic storm made of negative probability ions while Melissa, Zack, Cavendish, Dakota, Agent P, and Doof work their way through the alien populace to save their friend.

== Shorts ==
As part of a promotional campaign, Disney Channel began airing the Disney Theme Song Takeover wherein supporting characters from different shows performed the theme song to the series they were in.

No.	Title	Original release date
1	"Dr. Doofenshmirtz Theme Song Takeover"	April 19, 2019
Dr. Doofenshmirtz steps in for Milo to perform the theme song to Milo Murphy's Law, but discovers that it is more difficult than he thought.
