= Nightmare scenario =

A nightmare scenario may refer to:

- A worst-case scenario

== Medicine ==
- Sleep disorder, stress dreams

== Music ==
- The American punk rock band "New Bomb Turks"

== See also ==
- Nightmare
- Dystopia
- Existential risk
