= Resistentialism =

Jocular theory to describe seemingly spiteful behavior manifested by inanimate objects

Resistentialism is a jocular theory to describe "seemingly spiteful behavior manifested by inanimate objects", where objects that cause problems (like lost keys, a malfunctioning printer, or a runaway bouncy ball) are said to exhibit a high degree of malice toward humans. The theory posits a war being fought between humans and inanimate objects, and all the little annoyances that objects cause throughout the day are battles between the two.

The term was coined by humorist Paul Jennings in a 1948 piece in The Spectator titled "Report on Resistentialism" which stated: "Things always win, and man can only be free from them by not doing anything at all." The word is a blend of the Latin res ("thing"), the French résister ("to resist"), and the existentialism school of philosophy. The movement is a spoof of existentialism in general, and Jean-Paul Sartre in particular, Jennings naming the fictional inventor of Resistentialism as Pierre-Marie Ventre. The slogan of Resistentialism is "Les choses sont contre nous" ("Things are against us").

== Similar concepts ==
As discussed regarding the history of Murphy's law and of similar laws or corollaries such as Finagle's law and Sod's law, the perceived perversity of the universe has long been a subject of comment, and the concept may be as old as humanity. Examples from literature include the following:

- The autobiography of American businessman A.B. Farquhar records that soon after he first came to York, Pennsylvania, in 1856, one of the friends he met there "was reading in a magazine an article that set up the natural perversity of inanimate things. I entered into an argument with her. I urged that Nature was not cruel but kind, and that there was no perversity."
- Friedrich Theodor Vischer (1807–1887), in his novel Auch Einer, first published in 1879, developed the concept of Die Tücke des Objekts (the spite of the object), a comic theory that inanimate objects conspire against humans.
- M. R. James (1862–1936), in his horror short story "The Malice of Inanimate Objects", first published in 1933, prefigures Jennings' theories, but suggests a more sinister aspect to the phenomenon involving supernatural sentience and malevolence.
- In the 1920s Theodore M. Bernstein formulated what he jocularly called Bernstein's first law, which is that small dropped objects, such as cufflinks, will be found only in the place most inaccessible for retrieval.
- Writing in 1942, Louise Dickinson Rich mentioned the idea in a way plainly suggesting that it was not novel. Describing efforts to clear ground of brush and large stones for vegetable growing, she said facetiously, "I do believe in the malevolence of the inanimate, and of all inanimate objects, stones are the most malevolent."
- Resistentialism is the basis for the poem "Nightmare Number Three" by Stephen Vincent Benét, which was dramatized by George Lefferts for the 1950s radio drama series X Minus One.
- In Clifford D. Simak's science fiction short story "Skirmish", first published in 1950, machines start to become self-aware and revolt against human control.
- In Avram Davidson's science fiction short story "Or All the Seas with Oysters", first published in 1958, inanimate objects breed and undergo metamorphosis.
- The concept appears in the Discworld novels of English author Terry Pratchett, where it is referred to as malignity or malignance; one practical example the author gives is the tendency of garden hoses, no matter how carefully one coils and stores them, to unloop themselves overnight and tie the bicycle to the lawnmower. It is associated with Pratchett's Auditors of Reality, and possibly also with Anoia, whom he describes as a "goddess of things that stick in drawers."
- Thomas Pynchon's novel V. features the character of Benny Profane, who is under the impression that he can only deal successfully with animate objects. Throughout the novel, the dividing line between animate and inanimate objects become blurred, such as the Bad Priest, who is mostly machine, a talking protective suit named SHROUD, and sewer-dwelling alligators who are aware that they were intended to be toy pets for children.
- Farin Urlaub's single "Dusche" is a rock song in which the singer believes the contents of his house are planning to assassinate him.

== See also ==
- Animistic fallacy
- Intentional stance
