= Worst-Case Scenario series =

Merchandise and book series also sometimes called Prepared for the Worst

Worst-Case Scenario is a series of merchandise based on a 1999 book written by Joshua Piven and David Borgenicht and published by Chronicle Books. The series's first entry, The Worst-Case Scenario Survival Handbook, sold over 10 million copies worldwide and prompted a series of related books, games, calendars, and two television series. Later works have been published via Quirk Books and have been credited with giving the company enough funding to expand.

== Concept ==
A worst-case scenario is the most severe possible outcome that can be projected to occur in a given situation. Conceiving of worst-case scenarios is a common form of strategic planning to prepare for and minimize contingencies that could result in accidents, quality problems, or other issues. The books provide instructions for situations like landing a plane and surviving a shark attack.

== Television series ==
There have been two television series that have been loosely based on the book series, a 2002 TBS reality show and a 2010 survival skills television series on the Discovery Channel. Both series ran for only one season.

=== TBS (2002) ===
The show Worst Case Scenarios ran on TBS from July 10, 2002, through November 13, 2002, and had a total of 13 episodes. It was narrated by Mike Rowe and featured demonstrations by stunt men and stunt women. Each episode was hosted by new experts on how to survive worst-case scenarios. It also aired clips of real life situations, tips, volunteer challenges, and gadgets shown by Gear Girl (Danielle Burgio).

=== Discovery Channel (2010) ===
Worst-Case Scenario ran on the Discovery Channel beginning on May 5, 2010, and had a total of 12 episodes. It was hosted by Bear Grylls, who was shown using skills he learned in the 21 SAS, which included self-defense, evasive driving, parkour, urban survival, and wilderness survival.

== Books ==
- The Worst-Case Scenario Survival Handbook by Joshua Piven and David Borgenicht
- The Worst-Case Scenario Survival Handbook: Travel by Joshua Piven and David Borgenicht
- The Worst-Case Scenario Survival Handbook: Parenting by Joshua Piven, David Borgenicht, and Sarah Jordan
- The Worst-Case Scenario Survival Handbook: Weddings by Joshua Piven, David Borgenicht, and Sarah Jordan
- The Worst-Case Scenario Survival Handbook: College by Joshua Piven, David Borgenicht, and Jennifer Worick
- The Worst-Case Scenario Survival Handbook: Dating and Sex by Joshua Piven, David Borgenicht, and Jennifer Worick
- The Worst-Case Scenario Survival Handbook: Golf by Joshua Piven, David Borgenicht, and James Grace
- The Worst-Case Scenario Book of Survival Questions by Joshua Piven and David Borgenicht
- The Worst-Case Scenario Survival Handbook: LIFE by Joshua Piven and David Borgenicht
- The Worst-Case Scenario Survival Handbook: Holidays by Joshua Piven and David Borgenicht
- The Worst-Case Scenario Survival Handbook: Work by Joshua Piven and David Borgenicht
- The Worst-Case Scenario Survival Handbook: Paranormal by Joshua Piven and David Borgenicht
- The Complete Worst-Case Scenario Survival Handbook by Joshua Piven and David Borgenicht
- The Complete Worst-Case Scenario Survival Handbook: Man Skills by Joshua Piven and David Borgenicht

== Cards ==
- The Worst-Case Scenario Survival Cards
- The Worst-Case Scenario Holiday Survival Cards: Stuck in Chimney
- The Worst-Case Scenario Holiday Survival Cards: Unwanted Elves
- The Worst-Case Scenario Holiday Cards: Reindeer Attack

== Calendars ==
- The Worst-Case Scenario 2001 Survival Calendar: A Week-by-Week Guide to Surviving a Year's Worth of Peril by Joshua Piven and David Borgenicht ISBN 0-8118-2960-X
- The Worst-Case Scenario 2006 Survival Calendar: A Week-by-Week Guide to Surviving a Year's Worth of Peril by Joshua Piven and David Borgenicht
- The Worst-Case Scenario: Golf 2006 Daily Survival Calendar: A Day-by-Day Guide to Surviving a Year's Worth of Peril on the Green by Joshua Piven, David Borgenicht, and James Grace
- The Worst-Case Scenario 2007 Daily Survival Calendar: A Day-by-Day Guide to Surviving a Year's Worth of Peril by Joshua Piven and David Borgenicht
- The Worst-Case Scenario 2007 Survival Calendar: A Week-by-Week Guide to Surviving a Year's Worth of Peril by Joshua Piven and David Borgenicht
- The Worst-Case Scenario: Golf 2007 Daily Survival Calendar: A Day-by-Day Guide to Surviving a Year's Worth of Peril on the Green by Joshua Piven and David Borgenicht

== Other media ==
- Worst-Case Scenario: Sticky Situation Notes by Joshua Piven and David Borgenicht
- The Worst-Case Scenario Survival Journal by Joshua Piven and David Borgenicht
- The Worst-Case Scenario Dating & Sex Address Book by Joshua Piven, David Borgenicht, and Jennifer Worick

== In popular culture ==
- Artist Justin Sane wrote a song called "The Worst Case Survival Handbook" on his album Life, Love and the Pursuit of Justice.
