= Animistic fallacy =

Fallacy that intent acts to cause events

The animistic fallacy is the informal fallacy of arguing that an event or situation necessarily arose because someone intentionally acted to cause it. While it could be that someone set out to effect a specific goal, the fallacy appears in an argument that states this must be the case. The name of the fallacy comes from the animistic belief that changes in the physical world are the work of conscious spirits.

== Examples ==
Thomas Sowell in his book Knowledge and Decisions (1980) presents several arguments as examples of the animistic fallacy:

- that people earn wealth always because of superior choices
- that central planning is necessary to prevent chaos in society

Sowell repeatedly dismisses the necessity that order comes from design, and notes that fallacious animistic arguments tend to provide explanations that require comparatively little time to implement. In this light he contrasts the six-day creation of the world described in the Bible to the development of life over billions of years described by evolution.

== See also ==
- Anthropomorphism
- Argument from ignorance
- Pathetic fallacy
- Reification (fallacy)
- Resistentialism
- Teleological argument
