= The Butter Battle Book =

1984 children's book by Dr. Seuss

- Author: Dr. Seuss
- Illustrator: Dr. Seuss
- Language: English
- Genre: Children's literature, satire
- Publisher: Random House
- Publication date: January 12, 1984
- Publication place: United States
- Media type: Print (hardcover and paperback)
- ISBN: 0-394-86716-5
- OCLC: 10046060
- Dewey Decimal: [Fic] 19
- LC Class: PZ8.3.G276 Bu 1984
- Preceded by: Hunches in Bunches
- Followed by: You're Only Old Once!

The Butter Battle Book is a children's book written and illustrated by Dr. Seuss and published by Random House on January 12, 1984. It is an anti-war story; specifically, a parable about arms races in general, mutually assured destruction and nuclear weapons in particular. The Butter Battle Book was a New York Times Notable Book of the Year.

This book was written during the Cold War era and reflects the concerns of the time, regarding the perceived possibility that humanity could be destroyed in a nuclear war. It can also be seen as a satirical work, with its depiction of a deadly war based on a senseless conflict over something as trivial as a breakfast food.

== Plot ==
The Yooks and the Zooks are two factions of anthropomorphic birds living on opposite sides of a long curving wall. The Yooks wear blue clothes; the Zooks wear orange. The primary dispute between the two cultures is that the Yooks eat their bread with the butter-side up, while the Zooks eat their bread with the butter-side down. The conflict between the two sides leads to an escalating arms race, which results in the threat of mutual assured destruction.

The race begins when a Zook patrolman named VanItch slingshots the Yook patrolman's "Tough-Tufted Prickly Snick-Berry Switch" (a many-pronged whip). The Yooks then develop a machine with three slingshots interlinked, called a "Triple-Sling Jigger". This works once, but the Zooks counterattack with their own creation: the "Jigger-Rock Snatchem", a machine with three nets to fling the rocks fired by the Triple-Sling Jigger back to the Yooks' side.

The Yooks then create a gun called the "Kick-A-Poo Kid", loaded with "powerful Poo-A-Doo powder and ants' eggs and bees' legs and dried-fried clam chowder", and carried by a spaniel named Daniel. The Zooks counterattack with an "Eight-Nozzled Elephant-Toted Boom Blitz", a machine that shoots "high-explosive sour cherry stone pits". The Yooks then devise the "Utterly Sputter": a large blue vehicle intended "to sprinkle blue goo all over the Zooks". The Zooks counterattack with a Sputter identical to the Yooks'. Eventually, each side possesses a small but extremely destructive red bomb called the "Bitsy Big-Boy Boomeroo", and neither has any defense against it.

No resolution is reached by the book's end, with the generals of both sides on the wall poised to drop their bombs and waiting for the other to strike. The Yook patrolman's grandson (who had followed his grandfather to the wall) asks, "Who's gonna drop it? Will you, or will he?" To which he replies nervously, "Be patient. We'll see. We will see..."

== Analysis ==
External videos
- Panel discussion on "Nature of War in Dr. Seuss' Butter Battle Book", New York Law School, March 1, 2013, C-SPAN

The Butter Battle Book was removed from the shelves of some Canadian public libraries during the Cold War because of the book's controversial position regarding the arms race. The book was initially criticized over its dark moral nature being too much for the eyes and minds of children. Dr. Seuss himself was unsure if The Butter Battle Book was for adults or children when he approached Random House to have it published.

An article in the July 27, 1984, issue of the conservative magazine National Review found it plausible that the book was not more popular because of Seuss' promotion of a theme of "moral equivalence", where the difference between the Soviet Union and the United States was equivalent to a disagreement over the proper side on which to butter bread. On the other hand, Roger S. Clark, a professor at Rutgers University School of Law, argued in an article in the New York Law School Law Review that The Butter Battle Book stood out to him when it first came out because of its timing and context. Further, he noted the fact that Dr. Seuss portrayed an arms race during the time period in which the book was published made Seuss's intentions clear.

== Inspiration ==
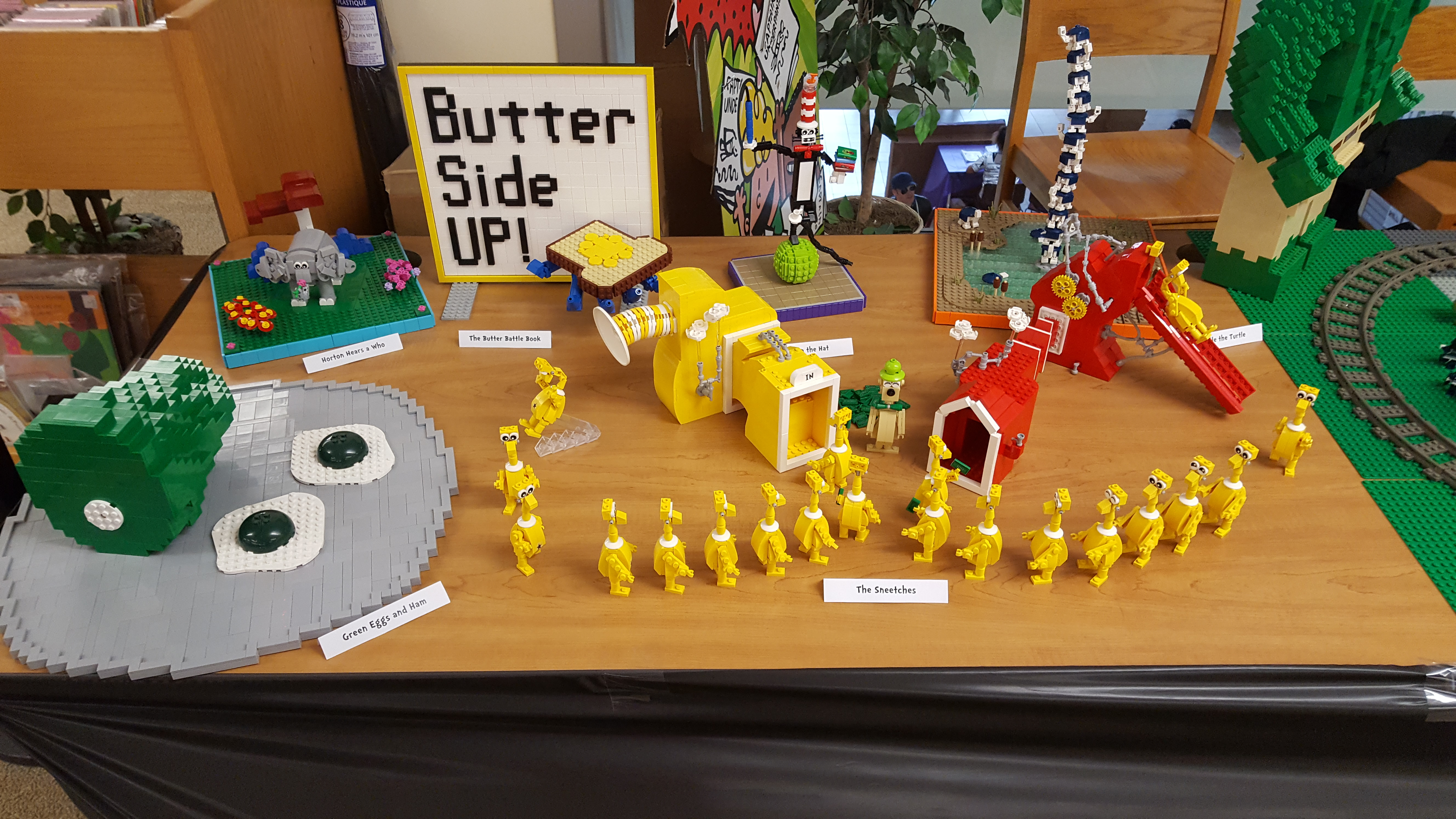
Lego display by Kyler Keller, of several Dr. Seuss books, including The Butter Battle Book.

Dr. Seuss wrote The Butter Battle Book while Ronald Reagan was in office, envisioning the potential of nuclear war with Russia. Reflecting back on his time in Europe in 1926, he remembered the Guelphs and Ghibellines from northern Italy that fought over their differing opinions on the Pope. Dr. Seuss distinctly recalled one group cutting their apples horizontally while the other cut them vertically. This concept of a war based on toast is similar to the war between Lilliput and Blefuscu in Jonathan Swift's 1726 satire Gulliver's Travels, which was nominally based on an argument over the correct end to crack an egg once soft-boiled.

== Adaptations ==
=== Television special ===
There was an animated TV special by animator and filmmaker Ralph Bakshi, narrated by Charles Durning and produced by and aired on TNT on November 13, 1989. The special followed the book quite closely, notably in its preservation of its original cliffhanger ending, with the addition of a title card that reads "The End (maybe)" at the conclusion of the story. Seuss himself called the short the most faithful adaptation of his work.

=== Green Eggs and Ham ===
The book serves as the basis for the second season of Green Eggs and Ham, subtitled The Second Serving. Here, it is established that Yookia and Zookia are ruled by a "Dooka" and "Dookess", respectively; residents of both nations are relatively harmless, yet are convinced that the other is evil. Sam-I-Am and Guy-Am-I end up on opposite sides of the conflict. The Bitsy Big-Boy Boomeroo is omitted in favor of a conflict over "Moo-Lacka-Moo", the substance said to serve as the Boomeroo's core in the book, which is acquired by the Yooks while the Zooks hire Guy to build a machine due to his habit of creating inventions that explode. Unlike the book, the conflict is resolved when the respective weapons destroy the wall, due in part to Sam-I-Am and his mother Pam's meddling, and Guy's step-daughter E.B. and the Dooka's son Looka share a butter sandwich with everyone watching.

== See also ==
- Buttered toast phenomenon
