= Alan Abelson =

American journalist (1925–2013)

- Born: October 12, 1925; New York City, U.S.
- Died: May 9, 2013 (aged 87); New York City
- Education: City College of New York; University of Iowa
- Occupations: Journalist, Editor
- Writing career
- Genre: Finance

Alan Abelson (October 12, 1925 – May 9, 2013) was a veteran financial journalist, and longtime writer of the Up and Down Wall Street column in Barron's Magazine.

== Career ==
He was editor of Barron's from 1981 until 1992. Abelson's columns at Barron's often took a skeptical look at the investment favorites and fads of the day, and sometimes spawned controversy and even lawsuits. While working for Barron's, he was responsible for editing the Investment News & Views section, writing corporate and industry features and the influential "Up and Down Wall Street" column. From July 1982 to October 1990, Abelson frequently appeared on NBC-TV's News at Sunrise as a business commentator. In 1999, less than a year before the crash of the dot-com bubble, he warned, "the market is grossly overvalued, more so, indeed, than it was in 1987 before the crash."

Prior to working for Barron's, Abelson worked as a copy boy for the New York Journal- American. He eventually worked his way up to becoming a reporter and then onto the financial desk. From 1952 to 1956, Abelson worked as the stock-market columnist for the paper.

== Education ==
Abelson obtained his Bachelor of Science degree in chemistry and English from City College of New York and later received his master's degree from the University of Iowa in creative writing.

== Death ==
Abelson died of a heart attack at a New York City Hospital on May 9, 2013. He was 87. Abelson was predeceased by his wife, the former Virginia Eloise Peterson, who died in 1999, and was survived by his two children, daughter Reed Abelson and son Justin Abelson, and five grandchildren.

== Awards and legacy ==
- 1998 Gerald Loeb Lifetime Achievement Award
- Abelson is responsible for coining Yhprum's law in 1974.
