= Yhprum's law =

Opposite of Murphy's law

Yhprum's law is the opposite of Murphy's law. ("Yhprum" is "Murphy" spelled backwards.) The simple formula of Yhprum's law is: "Everything that can work, will work."

A more specific formulation of the law by Richard Zeckhauser, a professor of political economy at Harvard University, states: "Sometimes systems that should not work, work nevertheless."

Resnick et al. (2006) used this law to describe how intensive and seemingly altruistic participation by giving ranking is observed in the eBay feedback system. Jøsang, in a discussion of online trust management, suggests that all similar "trust and reputation systems" are manifestations of Yhprum's law. He states the law in a similar form to Zeckhauser: "Something that shouldn't work sometimes does work." Arenas et al. in a similar discussion add the adjunct "...or at least work fairly well" to the law.

== Origin ==
Though Zeckhauser is often credited with coining, the first reference to Yhprum's law may have been by Alan Abelson in the financial newspaper Barron's in December 1974. Barron's version of the law is more in the way of a corollary to Murphy's law than its opposite: "anything that should go wrong, won't". Abelson coined the term to describe the gloomy financial predictions of the time which he thought were wrong, or at least wildly exaggerated. In Abelson's opinion, a depression only occurs when the warning signs are missed or ignored. The very act of predicting one will ensure that it does not happen.
