= Finagle's law =

Adage

Finagle's law of dynamic negatives (also known as Melody's law, Sod's Law or Finagle's corollary to Murphy's law) is usually rendered as "Anything that can go wrong, will—at the worst possible moment."

The term "Finagle's law" is often associated with John W. Campbell Jr., the influential editor of Astounding Science Fiction (later Analog).

== Variants ==
One variant (known as O'Toole's corollary of Finagle's law) favored among hackers is a takeoff on the second law of thermodynamics (related to the augmentation of entropy):

The perversity of the Universe tends towards a maximum.

In the Star Trek episode "Amok Time" (written by Theodore Sturgeon in 1967), Captain Kirk tells Spock, "As one of Finagle's laws puts it: 'Any home port the ship makes will be somebody else's, not mine.'"

The term "Finagle's law" was popularized by science fiction author Larry Niven in several stories (for example, Protector [Ballantine Books paperback edition, 4th printing, p. 23]), depicting a frontier culture of asteroid miners; this "Belter" culture professed a religion or running joke involving the worship of the dread god Finagle and his mad prophet Murphy.

"Finagle's law" can also be the related belief "Inanimate objects are out to get us", also known as Resistentialism. Similar to Finagle's law is the verbless phrase of the German novelist Friedrich Theodor Vischer: "die Tücke des Objekts" (the perfidy of inanimate objects).

A related concept, the "Finagle factor", is an ad hoc multiplicative or additive term in an equation, which can be justified only by the fact that it gives more correct results. Also known as Finagle's variable constant, it is sometimes defined as the correct answer divided by your answer.

One of the first records of the term is probably a December 1962 article titled "Finagle Factors" in The Michigan Technic, credited to John W. Campbell, but bylined "I. Finaglin".

The term is also used in a 1960 wildlife management article.

Arthur Bloch, in his book "Murphy's Law and Other Reasons Why Things Go Wrong" (1977) stated variations on this:

- Finagle's First Law: "If an experiment works, something has gone wrong."
- Finagle's Second Law: "No matter what the anticipated result, there will always be someone eager to (a) misinterpret it, (b) fake it, (c) believe it happened to his own pet theory."
- Finagle's Third Law: "In any collection of data, the figure most obviously correct, beyond all need of checking, is the mistake.

Corollaries: 1. No one whom you ask for help will see it. 2. Everyone who stops by with unsought advice will see it immediately."

- Finagle's Fourth Law: "Once a job is fouled up, anything done to improve it only makes it worse."

== See also ==
- Hanlon's razor
- Hofstadter's law
- List of eponymous laws
- Murphy's law
- Resistentialism
- Sod's law
- Sturgeon's law
