= Shit happens =

Slang phrase used as a simple existential observation

Shit happens is a slang sentence that is used as a simple existential observation that life is full of unfortunate unpredictable events, similar to "c'est la vie". The sentence is an acknowledgment that bad things happen to people seemingly for no particular reason.

It can also be said less vulgarly, including phrases such as "it happens" or "stuff happens".

== History ==
The fact that people have been remarking that "shit happens" has been attested from 1964, when Carl Werthman quoted an example in his UC Berkeley masters thesis; the relevant excerpt was published in The American City (edited by Anselm L. Strauss) in 1968.

== Examples of usage ==
In 2011, Australian politician Tony Abbott, who was at the time Opposition Leader and leader of the Liberal Party (later becoming Prime Minister), used the sentence in an interview.

== Popular culture ==
A pick-up truck with a "SHIT HAPPENS" bumper sticker appears in the film Forrest Gump (1994). In an incident that illustrates the slogan, the truck gets into a collision.

The 1994 film Forrest Gump, makes a famous reference to "shit happens" in a scene where Forrest is running across the United States and in response to being told "...you just ran through a big pile of dog shit." he replies "It happens.", with the following scene showing a pick-up truck driving away with the bumper sticker "shit happens" on it and the pick-up then immediately becomes involved in a collision with a second car. The film is making reference to bumper stickers that can be seen in everyday life that include the phrase "shit happens", especially in the United States.

"Shit happens." is also a recurring phrase in 1990 film Predator 2, first said by Jamaican gangster Gold Tooth as he dismisses his own organization's Voodoo beliefs by saying "I tell you what I believe — shit happens." When he and his men are ambushed by the titular antagonist of the film, he once again says "Shit happens." as he's the last man standing and about to be killed. Later on in the film, when the City Hunter is battling the protagonist, and has been unmasked, one of his demonstrations of his ability to mimic human speech is shown by him saying "Shit happens." as he tries to engage his self-destruct device. Lastly, at the climax of their battle, Harrigan triumphantly says "That's right, asshole — shit happens!" as he kills The City Hunter with one of his own weapons.

== See also ==
- Murphy's law – Adage that anything that can go wrong will go wrong
- Butterfly effect – Idea that small causes can have large effects
