= Arthur Bloch =

American writer and humorist (born 1948)

Arthur Bloch (born January 1, 1948) is an American writer, author of the Murphy's Law books. He has also written a self-help satire called Healing Yourself with Wishful Thinking. From 1986 to 2002 he was the producer and director of the Thinking Allowed PBS television series.

The proper title of the book is Murphy's Law, and Other Reasons Why Things Go Wrong!. The word wrong is printed upside-down on the book's cover. This was the first of many Murphy's Law books.

== Bibliography ==
=== Murphy's Law series ===
- Bloch, Arthur (1977). Murphy's Law, and Other Reasons Why Things Go WRONG!. Los Angeles: Price Stern Sloan. ISBN 978-0843104288.
- Bloch, Arthur (1980). Murphy's Law Book Two: More Reasons Why Things Go Wrong!. Los Angeles: Price Stern Sloan. ISBN 978-0843106749.
- Bloch, Arthur (1982). Murphy's Law Book Three: Wrong Reasons Why Things Go Right!. Los Angeles: Price Stern Sloan. ISBN 978-0843106886.
- Bloch, Arthur (1985). Murphy's Law Golf. Los Angeles: Price Stern Sloan. ISBN 978-0843112375.
- Bloch, Arthur (1988). Murphy's Law: A Pop-Up Book. Los Angeles: Price Stern Sloan. ISBN 978-0843122398.
- Bloch, Arthur (1990). The Complete Murphy's Law: A Definitive Collection. Los Angeles: Price Stern Sloan. ISBN 978-0843129687.
- Bloch, Arthur (1999). Murphy's Law 2000: What Else Can Go Wrong in the 21st Century!. Los Angeles: Price Stern Sloan. ISBN 978-0843174823.
- Bloch, Arthur (2000). Murphy's Law: Doctors. Los Angeles: Price Stern Sloan. ISBN 978-0843175813.
- Bloch, Arthur (2000). Murphy's Law: Lawyers. Los Angeles: Price Stern Sloan. ISBN 978-0843175806.
- Bloch, Arthur (2002). Murphy's Law Doctors: Malpractice Makes Perfect. Kansas City: Andrews McMeel Publishing. ISBN 978-0740722639.
- Bloch, Arthur (2002). Murphy's Law Lawyers: Wronging the Rights in the Legal Profession. Kansas City: Andrews McMeel Publishing. ISBN 978-0740722646.
- Bloch, Arthur (2003). Murphy's Law: 26th Anniversary Edition. New York: Perigee Books. ISBN 978-0399529306.

=== Other works ===
- Bloch, Arthur (2002). Healing Yourself with Wishful Thinking. Berkeley: Ten Speed Press. ISBN 978-1580084406.
