= Defensive pessimism =

Cognitive strategy for preparation

Defensive pessimism is a cognitive strategy in which an individual sets a low expectation for their performance, regardless of how well they have done in the past. Individuals use defensive pessimism as a strategy to prepare for anxiety-provoking events or performances. Defensive pessimists then think through specific negative events and setbacks that could adversely influence their goal pursuits. By envisioning possible negative outcomes, defensive pessimists can take action to avoid or prepare for them. Using this strategy, defensive pessimists can advantageously harness anxiety that might otherwise harm their performance.

Defensive pessimism is utilized in a variety of domains, and public speaking provides a good example of the process involved in this strategy. Defensive pessimists could alleviate their anxiety over public speaking by imagining possible obstacles such as forgetting the speech, being thirsty, or staining their shirts before the event. Because defensive pessimists have thought of these problems, they can appropriately prepare to face the challenges ahead. The speaker could, for instance, create note cards with cues about the speech, place a cup of water on the podium to alleviate thirst, and bring a bleach pen to remove shirt stains. These preventive actions both reduce anxiety and promote superior performance.

Defensive pessimism was identified by Nancy Cantor and her students in the mid-1980s.

== Key components ==
=== Prefactual thinking ===
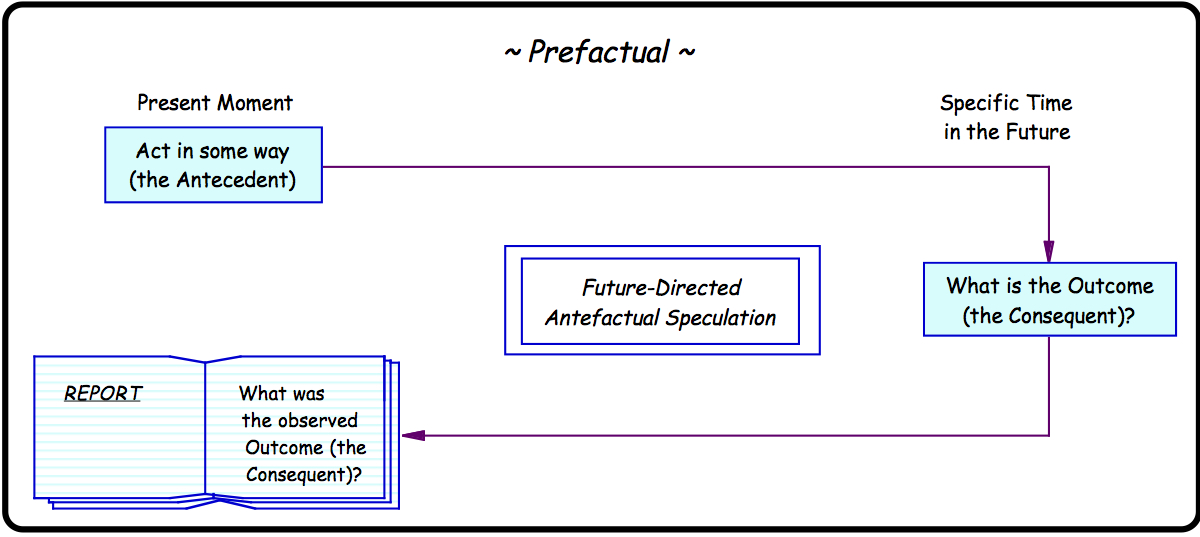
Temporal representation of a prefactual thought experiment

Prefactual (i.e., "before the fact") thinking is an essential component of defensive pessimism. Synonymous with anticipation, it denotes a cognitive strategy in which people imagine possible outcomes of a future scenario. The term prefactual was specifically coined by Lawrence J. Sanna, in 1998, to denote those activities that speculate on possible future outcomes, given the present, and ask "What will be the outcome if event E occurs?"

The imagined outcomes are either positive/desirable, negative/undesirable, or neutral. Prefactual thinking can be advantageous because it allows the individual to prepare for possible outcomes of a scenario.

For defensive pessimists, prefactual thinking offers the primary and critical method to alleviate anxiety. Usually, this prefactual thinking is paired with a pessimistic outlook, resulting in negative/undesirable imagined scenarios. With regard to the earlier example, the public speaking defensive pessimist anticipates forgetting the speech or becoming thirsty as opposed to giving an amazing speech and receiving a standing ovation. These negative reflections allow for defensive pessimists to view potential scenarios in a way that motivates preventative action, rather than through a lens of fear. Norem (2008) linked this to 'implementation intentions' where large goals are broken down into more tangible pieces, which defensive pessimists can utilise.

=== Low expectations ===
Alongside simulating potential outcomes, defensive pessimists set deliberately low expectations for themselves, based on these simulations, even when they have a history of success. By envisioning the "worst case", individuals set a low expectation, further allowing for psychological preparedness, as anything better is less emotionally taxing. Norem and Cantor (1986) found that defensive pessimists consistently predict poorer performance than reality, showing that setting low expectations is adaptive, not inhibitive.

=== Anxiety ===
As defensive pessimism is motivated by a need to manage anxiety, it is unsurprisingly also correlated with trait anxiety and neuroticism. Negative mood states promote defensive pessimists' goal attainment strategy by facilitating the generation of potential setbacks and negative outcomes that could arise during goal pursuit, which can then be anticipated and prevented, as well as lowering their general expectations. When defensive pessimists are encouraged into positive or even just neutral mood states, they perform worse on experimental tasks than when in a negative mood state. They are more anxious because they are prevented from properly implementing their preferred cognitive strategy for goal attainment.

The relationship between reflection and anxiety has been attributed as a key component in defensive pessimism. Two hypotheses have been presented about this relationship: the dissipation and harnessing hypotheses. The dissipation hypothesis suggests that rumination dissipates general negative views and anxiety once the anticipated performance begins. On the other hand, the harnessing hypothesis suggests that there are high levels of anxiety post-performance, leading to the use of prefactual thinking. Although more research is needed to conclude on this relationship, Seery et al (2008) found that negative imagery likely increases anxiety, motivating individuals to utilise defensive pessimism, aligning with the harnessing hypothesis.

== Self-esteem ==
Defensive pessimism is generally related to lower self-esteem since the strategy involves self-criticism, pessimism, and discounting previous successful performances. Indeed, Norem and Burdzovic Andreas (2006) found that, compared to optimists, defensive pessimists had lower self-esteem entering college. At the end of four years of college, however, the self-esteem of the defensive pessimists had increased to nearly equal levels as optimists. The self-esteem of optimists had not changed, and the self-esteem of pessimists who did not employ defensive pessimism had fallen slightly by the end of college. While defensive pessimism may have implications for self-esteem, it appears that these effects lessen over time.

== Compared to pessimism ==
Unlike pessimism, defensive pessimism is not an internal, global, and stable attribution style, but rather a cognitive strategy utilized within the context of certain goals. Pessimism involves rumination about possible negative outcomes of a situation without proactive behavior to counteract these outcomes. Defensive pessimism, on the other hand, utilizes the foresight of negative situations in order to prepare against them. The negative possible outcomes of a situation often motivate defensive pessimists to work harder for success. Since defensive pessimists are anxious, but not certain, that negative situations will arise, they still feel that they can control their outcomes. For example, a defensive pessimist would not avoid all job interviews for fear of failing one. Instead, a defensive pessimist would anticipate possible challenges that could come in an upcoming job interview – such as dress code, stubborn interviewers, and tough questions – and prepare rigorously to face them. Defensive pessimism is not a reaction to stressful events nor does it entail ruminating on events of the past, and should therefore be distinguished from pessimism as a trait or a more general negative outlook. Instead, defensive pessimists are able to stop using this strategy once it is no longer beneficial (i.e., does not serve a preparatory role).

== Compared to other cognitive strategies ==
=== Self-handicapping ===
Elliot and Church (2003) determined that people adopt defensive pessimism or self-handicapping strategies for the same reason: to deal with anxiety-provoking situations. Self-handicapping is a cognitive strategy in which people construct obstacles to their own success to keep failure from damaging their self-esteem. The difference between self-handicapping and defensive pessimism lies in the motivation behind the strategies. Beyond managing anxiety, defensive pessimism is further motivated by a desire for high achievement. Self-handicappers, however, feel no such need. Elliot and Church found that the self-handicapping strategy undermined goal achievement while defensive pessimism aided achievement. People who self-handicapped were high in avoidance motivation and low in approach motivation. They wanted to avoid anxiety but were not motivated to approach success. Defensive pessimists, on the other hand, were motivated to approach success and goal attainment while simultaneously avoiding the anxiety associated with performance. Although it was found that defensive pessimism was positively correlated with goals related to both performance-avoidance and anxiety-avoidance, it was not found to be a predictor of one's mastery of goals.

=== Strategic optimism ===
In research, defensive pessimism is frequently contrasted with strategic optimism, another cognitive strategy. When facing performance situations, strategic optimists feel that they will end well. Therefore, though they plan ahead, they plan only minimally because they do not have any anxiety to face. While defensive pessimists set low expectations, feel anxious, and rehearse possible negative outcomes of situations, strategic optimists set high expectations, feel calm, and do not reflect on the situation any more than absolutely necessary. In fact, strategic optimists who engaged in reflexivity reported less positive affect and life satisfaction compared to those who didn't; defensive pessimists reported to benefit from reflecting on their performance and goals. Strategic optimists start out with different motivations and obstacles: unlike defensive pessimists, strategic optimists do not have any anxiety to surmount.

Unlike defensive pessimists, strategic optimists trust their previous base rate of success and expectations, and are more concerned with engaging in 'damage control' if a failure occurs, which is called post-hoc cushioning. Strategic optimists demonstrated “attributional egotism,” where they claimed greater control over the outcome of their performance when it was positive compared to when they failed. Defensive pessimists did not demonstrate differences in their perception of control across success and failure conditions. This is attributed to the initial lowering of expectations that defensive pessimists partake in, which acts as an anticipatory cushion. In spite of their differences in motivation and perception, strategic optimists and defensive pessimists have similar objective performance outcomes. For both strategic optimists and defensive pessimists, their respective cognitive strategies are adaptive and promote success. Both groups report similar levels of satisfaction with success feedback, these strategies are differentiated by the stages at which they cognitively "cushion" unsuccessful scenarios.

Strategic optimism also differs in its long-term effectiveness, as adopting academic and social optimistic strategies is positively linked to greater future-oriented motivation, unlike defensive pessimism. Seginer (2000) observed that students with high social optimism were more explorative and committed to future educational goals than those who scored lower. Within education, only strategic optimists were positively correlated with both motivational and behavioural aspects of long-term future orientation, concluding that optimism 'underpins future orientation.'

== Measurements of Defensive Pessimism ==
=== The Optimism-Pessimism Prescreening Questionnaire (OPPQ) ===
Norem and Cantor (1986) developed a prescreening questionnaire to identify the optimistic or defensively pessimistic cognitive strategies used through self-report. This includes 9 questions which flow on an 11-point Likert scale ranging from not at all true of me (1) to very true of me (11). This consists of four optimistic items (Questions 2, 5, 7, and 9 and four pessimistic items (Questions 1, 4, 6, and 8), which are combined to produce an overall optimism-pessimism score. Question 3 ('I've generally done pretty well in academic situations in the past') was included to gauge the willingness of participants to acknowledge previous successes. This allowed for the creation of four profiles: optimistic, defensive pessimistic, "regular" pessimistic, and an "unjustified" optimistic. In this, defensive pessimists recognise past positive experiences but have low future expectations. The OPPD is only concerned with academic situations and does not consider defensive pessimism a broad cognitive strategy, but a selective academic strategy.

=== Defensive Pessimism Questionnaire (DPQ) ===
In 2001, Jules Norem created the revised Defensive Pessimism Questionnaire, focused specifically on measuring defensive pessimism, replacing the OPPQ. This consists of 17 questions, using a 7-point Likert scale, considering the concepts of reflexivity and pessimism, the sum of which results in a person's overall defensive pessimism score. This is also only interested in academic and social situations. Similar to the OPPQ, this questionnaire classifies respondents into three categories: Defensive pessimists, strategic optimists, and aschematic (neither strategy is used).

Norem critiqued the OPPQ due to its reliance on theoretical assumptions, such as the notion that optimism and pessimism are opposites, rather than empirical evidence. The OPPQ includes items such as “I often think about what it will be like if I do poorly in an academic situation,’’ and “I often think about what it will be like if I do very well in an academic situation,” measuring optimism and pessimism separately. Norem cites subsequent research that concludes that those who often reflect on negative outcomes tend to do the same for positive outcomes as well. In line with current literature, Norem suggests that defensive pessimists engage in a "thinking-through" process that considers all outcomes. These advances prompted the creation of the DPQ, focusing on the thinking-through process by measuring reflexivity, as well as pessimism.

== Strategy effectiveness ==
Though defensive pessimists are less satisfied with their performances and rate themselves higher in "need for improvement," they do not actually perform worse than people with a more optimistic strategy. Norem and Cantor (1986) investigated whether encouraging defensive pessimists, and thereby interfering with their typical negative thinking, would result in worse performances. Participants in the study were in either encouragement or non-encouragement scenarios as they prepared to complete anagram and puzzle tasks. In the encouragement condition, the defensive pessimists were told that, based on their GPA, they should expect to do well. Defensive pessimists performed worse when encouraged than the defensive pessimists whose strategy was not manipulated. Similarly multiple studies have found that inducing a positive mood through listening to music or watching film clips resulted in lowered academic performance. This effectiveness is not only reduced through interference, but naturally occurring positive mood directly correlated to significantly worse performance for those utilising defensive pessimism, whereas negative mood did not affect their performance. Defensive pessimism is an adaptive strategy for those who struggle with anxiety: their performance decreases if they are unable to appropriately manage and counteract their anxiety. This is most effective for those with naturally occurring negative mood when they are not interfered with.

The effectiveness of defensive pessimism appears to vary depending on a person's level of social evaluative concern, which refers to the level of fear or anxiety someone experiences in social situations, ranging from shyness to social phobias. Research has shown how those with high levels of defensive pessimism and social evaluative concern display greater avoidance behaviour towards anxiety-inducing events. Conversely, those with lower social evaluative concern benefited more from defensive pessimism; high defensive pessimism was correlated with significantly lowered avoidance behaviour. While defensive pessimism is an effective cognitive strategy, its effectiveness may be moderated by an individual's social anxiety levels.

Defensive pessimism is a future-oriented cognitive strategy aimed at managing anxiety for upcoming situations, instead of encouraging long-term goal setting. When studying adolescents in Israel, Norem and Ilingworth (1993) found that excessive mental preparation in defensive pessimists was correlated with lowered motivation when considering the long-term, suggesting this strategy may hinder future-oriented thinking. While defensive pessimism can help anxious individuals' performance in the short term, research suggests that its long-term effects on emotional well-being may be mixed, with some evidence pointing to increased stress or negative mood over time.

== See also ==
- Cultural pessimism – Conviction that culture is in decline
- Depressive realism – Hypothesis about depression
- Negative visualization – Visualization of the worst-case scenario(s)
- Optimism – Positive mental attitude
- Preparedness paradox – Perceived risk of mitigated dangers
- Pessimism – Negative mental attitude
- Worst-case scenario – Concept in risk management
