= Negative visualization =

Visualization of the worst-case scenario(s)

Negative visualization or futurorum malorum præmeditatio (Latin, literally, pre-studying bad future) is a method of meditative praxis or askēsis by visualization of the worst-case scenario(s). The method originated with the Cyrenaic philosophers and was later adopted by Stoic philosophers. The technique was made popular with publications of Seneca the Younger's Epistulae Morales ad Lucilium. It is thought to have been one of the common forms of Stoic spiritual exercises.

Unlike the general focus of creative visualization of inducing an imaginary positive psychological and physiologic response, negative visualization focuses on training the practitioner on the negative outcomes of realistic life scenarios to desensitize or create psychological fitness in preparation for real-life losses and also to induce feelings of gratitude towards the real things or actual status that the practitioner has. The severeness of negative visualization range from as mild as thinking of a minor inconvenience, e.g. having to abandon a minor pleasure, to as severe as total immersion in an imagined scenario in which the worst fear(s) of the practitioner has (have) really occurred, e.g. the loss of resources, status or life.

In the 21st century, inspired by English translations of Seneca's Epistulae Morales ad Lucilium, several Anglophone Stoics coined the expression "negative visualization" and gave it the Dog-Latin expression "premeditatio malorum", often without providing citations. Before that, the expression "negative visualization" had negative connotations of being the opposite of rhetorical or self-help creative visualization. According to accounts of some modern Stoics, negative visualization has been adopted by cognitive behavioral therapy (CBT) and similar psychosocial approaches to psychotherapy, a claim supported by some licensed psychologists although it has mostly been adopted by pop psychologists in the Anglosphere.

Modern Stoics advise practicing negative visualization daily at a set time, such as early in the morning or late at night. In the Meditations of Marcus Aurelius Book II.I, the author recommends to himself that he performs the following negative visualization in the early morning:

Betimes in the morning say to thyself, This day I shalt have to do with an idle curious man, with an unthankful man, a railer, a crafty, false, or an envious man; an unsociable uncharitable man. All these ill qualities have happened unto them, through ignorance of that which is truly good and truly bad. But I that understand the nature of that which is good, that it only is to be desired, and of that which is bad, that it only is truly odious and shameful: who know moreover, that this transgressor, whosoever he be, is my kinsman, not by the same blood and seed, but by participation of the same reason, and of the same divine particle; How can I either be hurt by any of those, since it is not in their power to make me incur anything that is truly reproachful? or angry, and ill affected towards him, who by nature is so near unto me? for we are all born to be fellow-workers, as the feet, the hands, and the eyelids; as the rows of the upper and under teeth: for such therefore to be in opposition, is against nature; and what is it to chafe at, and to be averse from, but to be in opposition?

== Mortality salience ==
Seneca's Epistulae Morales ad Lucilium advise Lucilius Junior to meditate on death. Later, Epictetus was reported by his students in his Discourses to advise reminding oneself of the impermanent nature of things and the mortality of living beings. Memento mori (Latin 'remember death'), or contemplation of death, is considered by the Stoics to be one form of negative visualization, since it trains the practitioner of the inevitability of death, whether that of the practitioner, of one's loved ones, or of everyone.

== See also ==
- Defensive pessimism
- Worst-case scenario
