= Worst-case scenario =

Concept in risk management

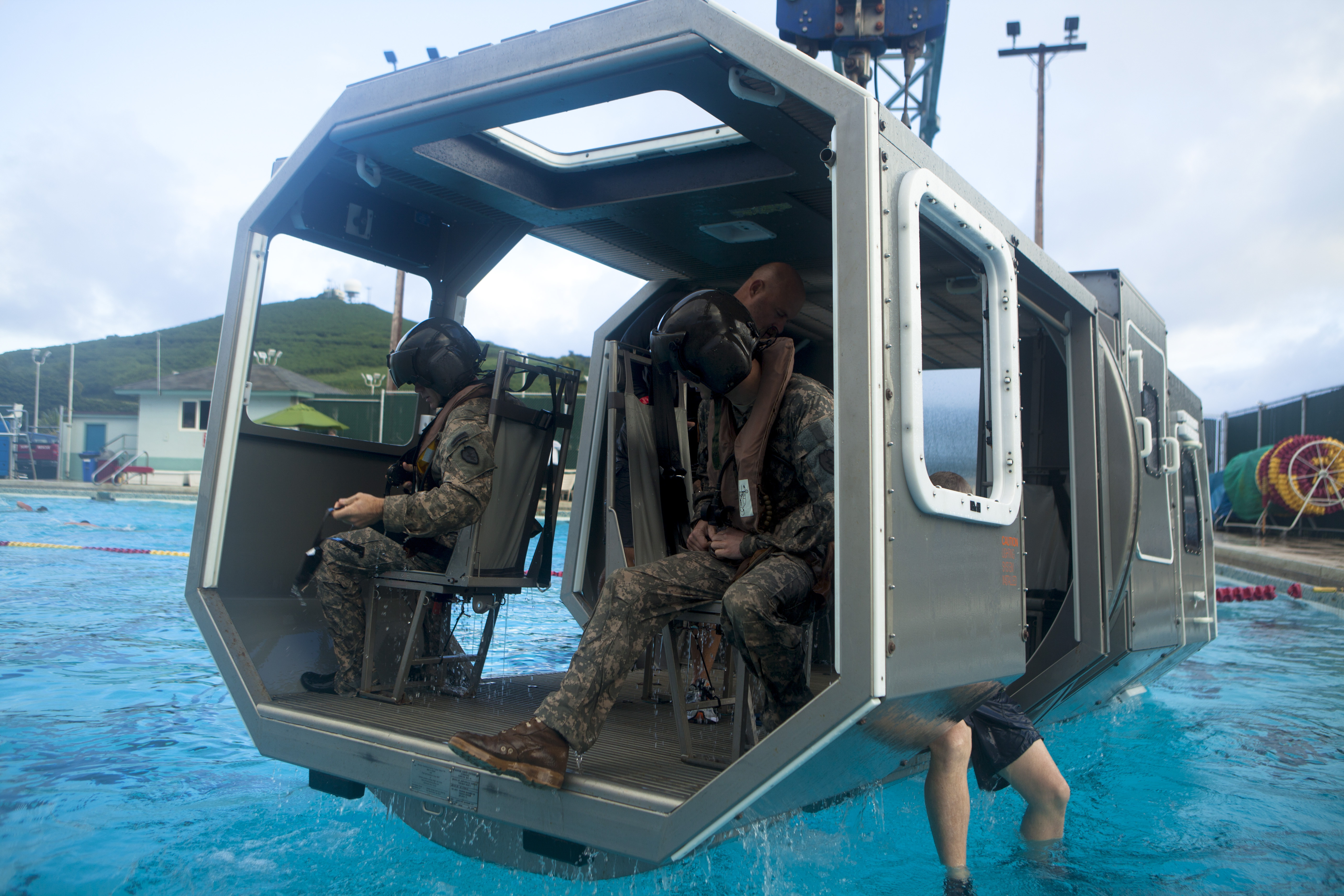
Soldiers training for a worst-case scenario prepare for a simulated underwater helicopter crash.

A worst-case scenario is a hypothetical concept in risk management wherein the planner, in planning for potential disasters, considers the most severe possible outcome that can reasonably be projected to occur in a given situation. Conceiving of worst-case scenarios is a common form of strategic planning, specifically scenario planning, to prepare for and minimize contingencies that could result in accidents, quality problems, or other issues.

== Development and use ==
The worst-case scenario is "[o]ne of the most commonly used alternative scenarios". A risk manager may request "a conservative risk estimate representing a worst-case scenario" in order to determine the latitude they may exercise in planning steps to reduce risks. Generally, a worst-case scenario "is settled upon by agreeing that a given worst case is bad enough. However, it is important to recognize that no worst-case scenario is truly without potential nasty surprises". In other words, ‘[a] “worst-case scenario” is never the worst case’, both because situations may arise that no planner could reasonably foresee, and because a given worst-case scenario is likely to consider only contingencies expected to arise in connection with a particular disaster. The worst-case scenario devised by a seismologist might be a particularly bad earthquake, and the worst-case scenario devised by a meteorologist might be a particularly bad hurricane, but it is unlikely that either of them will devise a scenario where a particularly bad storm occurs at the same time as a particularly bad earthquake.

The definition of a worst-case scenario varies by the field to which it is being applied. For example, in environmental engineering", "[a] worst-case scenario is defined as the release of the largest quantity of a regulated substance from a single vessel or process line failure that results in the greatest distance to an endpoint". In this field, "[a]s in other fields, the worst-case scenario is a useful device when low probability events may result in a catastrophe that must be avoided even at great cost, but in most health risk assessments, a worst-case scenario is essentially a type of bounding estimate". In computer science, the best, worst, and average case of a given algorithm express what the resource usage is at least, at most and on average, respectively. For many individuals, a worst-case scenario is one that would result in their own death.

== Criticisms ==
A number of criticisms have been leveled against the use of worst-case scenarios. In some cases, a conceivable worst-case scenario within a field may be so far beyond the capacity of participants to deal with that it is not worth the effort to develop or explore such a scenario; where this is possible, it is "important to evaluate whether the development of a worst-case scenario is reasonable and desirable". Entities that rely on such scenarios in planning may be led to plan too conservatively to take advantage of the usual absence of such scenarios, and may waste resources preparing for highly unlikely contingencies. At the extreme, it has been argued that the use of worst-case scenarios in disaster preparedness and training causes people to become conditioned to set aside ethical concerns and to over-react to lesser disasters.

Ben-Haim and Elishakoff, Elishakoff et al. and Hlavacek et al. developed the worst-case analysis based on convex constraints, representing uncertainty in applied mechanics.

== See also ==
- Defensive pessimism – Cognitive strategy for preparation
- Minimax – Decision rule used for minimizing the possible loss for a worst-case scenario
- Negative visualization – Visualization of the worst-case scenario(s)
- Pre-mortem – Project strategy to lower risk by assuming failure and brainstorming possible causes
- Worst-Case Scenario series – Merchandise and book series also sometimes called Prepared for the Worst, a series of books inspired by The Worst-Case Scenario Survival Handbook, providing tips for surviving such scenarios
- Worst-case complexity – Upper bound on resources required by an algorithm
