= Competency management system =

Competency (or competence) management systems (CMS or CompMS – because CMS is a more common homonym) are usually associated with, and may include, a learning management system (LMS). The LMS is typically a web-based tool that allows access to learning resources. Competency Management Systems tend to have a more multidimensional and comprehensive approach and include tools such as competency management, skills-gap analysis, succession planning, as well as competency analysis and profiling. The CompMS tends to focus more on creating an environment of sustainable competency in addition to entering and tracking learning resources in software. However, conceptually, there is no reason why a CompMS or LMS could not be manual (i.e. not computer-based) and indeed learning management systems are as old as learning institutions.

One view is that competency management systems may be based on adult learning and occupational task analysis principles, such as DACUM, which identify the business processes in a company and break them down into tasks. These tasks are what an individual needs to do in their work.

Modern techniques use competency-based management methodologies to develop a competency architecture for an organization. This architecture captures key competencies into a competency dictionary that is subsequently used in the creation of job descriptions. Competency-based performance management can then be employed to measure and discover learning gaps that then drive the training course selections for an employee.

There is as yet no generally agreed definition of competence. This lack of consensus at the moment can be seen by the efforts of the IEEE to define standards in the area of competency, such as their 1484 series of standards; for example, see the standard for reusable competency definitions.

To some people, the term competence may be synonymous with skills. To others, a broader definition of competence would be that competence = skills + knowledge + behaviours. For example, educational institutions (certainly higher educational institutions) are more focussed on the informational dimension of competence. Hence for many professions, formal education and graduation are followed by a period of practice typically under the direction of qualified practitioners. Such post-education practical work is where someone picks up skills and behaviours needed to be a competent practitioner. The need to acquire education, skills, and an ability to perform professional behaviour are frequently the requirements of a competent practitioner. More sophisticated definitions of competence or competency would add two more dimensions: (1) the 'level' at which a person may be required to work 'competently', and (2) the context in which a competence is being exercised.

As used by The Gill Payne Partnership Ltd extensively within the energy sector since 1992, their definition of competence is "The ability for a person to perform a required and/or specified activity, safely, to a set standard, and under varying conditions". In the competence standards they create for clients and use within their systems, they develop Performance Standards and, Knowledge and Understanding Standards. Performance Standards are those activities that people are expected to do in the job role, if you like – what the role entails in the way of practical activity – the 'how' and 'what' of the job role. Knowledge and Understanding Standards are the 'what the person is expected to know and understand' in fulfilling their job role, the 'why' the how and what are done in the job. It is quite common for their clients to ask about separate Behaviour and Attitude Standards however, The Gill Payne Partnership Ltd usually embeds these within the Performance Standards as they are in effect, a 'practical activity' required in the role i.e., 'certain behaviours and/or attitudes are required to be demonstrated' in the job role.

An early discussion of competence management can be found in a paper by Darnton.

The maintenance of a set of competencies in an organization of, say, 40,000 employees is particularly challenging. Classroom-based, or training course are not easy to use to provide the scale necessary to maintain the competences of such a large number of people. A typical sequence of activities to use a competence management system in such a situation looks like this:

1. Identify all things that need to be done by people in the organization in order to provide an inventory of required competencies and audit the competencies currently available;
2. Use the strategy of the organization to define the competencies needed in order to implement the strategy;
3. Perform a 'gap analysis' (in the cases of both 1 and 2) to identify the competencies currently available to the organization and the competencies it actually needs;
4. Use the results of the gap analysis to identify the competence development needed if the organization is to have the competencies it needs;
5. Commission the required competence development;
6. Manage training.

As the required development is being done, it will probably be necessary to use a learning management system to manage all the required learning; developing or maintaining the competence of a 40,000 person workforce will usually require careful use of all aspects of blended learning. A competence management system is able to track the competence requirements of the organization and identify any remaining gaps. It is also able to track the experience of people to add to their learning in order to provide an evidence base for assertions of competence.

Typically, an organization will also establish and maintain a competence dictionary.

Modern Competency Management

The problem with traditional competency management is that it perceives competency development as specific event-based interventions (e.g., "manage training"). Newer definitions take into account that unlike training, which is an event, learning is a process that should never end. Organizations recognizing that changes in skill requirements are now the norm, understand that only a culture of learning will enable people to remain competent through lifelong learning. They use systems and processes that intrinsically motivate people within their organizations to want to learn continuously. That enables people do self-develop at scale, such that number of people in an organization is no longer a challenge.

== See also ==
- Educational technology
- Knowledge capture
- Lifelong learning
- Strategic human resource planning
- Virtual learning environment
