= Recognition of prior learning =

Evaluating outside-classroom knowledge

Recognition of prior learning (RPL), prior learning assessment (PLA), or prior learning assessment and recognition (PLAR) describes a process used by regulatory bodies, adult learning centres, career development practitioners, military organizations, human resources professionals, employers, training institutions, schools, colleges and universities around the world to evaluate skills and knowledge acquired outside the classroom to recognize competence against a given set of standards, competencies, or learning outcomes. RPL is practiced in many countries for a variety of purposes, for example, an individual's standing in a profession, trades qualifications, academic achievement, recruitment, performance management, career and succession planning.

Methods of assessing prior learning are varied and include: evaluation of prior experience gained through volunteer work, previous paid or unpaid employment, or observation of actual workplace behavior. The essential element of RPL is that it is an assessment of evidence provided by an individual to support their claim for competence against a given set of standards or learning outcomes.

RPL is sometimes confused with credit transfer, assessments conducted to recognize advanced standing or for assigning academic credit. The essential difference between the two is that RPL considers evidence of competence that may be drawn from any aspect of an applicant's professional or personal life. Credit transfer and advanced standing deal primarily with an evaluation of academic performance as it relates to a particular field of study and whether or not advanced standing may be granted towards the gaining of additional qualifications. Some academic institutions include credit transfer within their overall RPL umbrella, as the process still involves assessment of prior learning, regardless of how achieved.

== Terminology ==
RPL is known by many names in different countries. It is APL (Accreditation of Prior Learning), CCC (Crediting Current Competence), or APEL (Accrediting Prior Experiential Learning) in the UK, RPL in Australia, New Zealand, and South Africa, and PLAR (Prior Learning Assessment and Recognition) in Canada (although different jurisdictions within Canada use RPL and RCC (Recognition of Current Competence). France has a more sophisticated system in which assessment is known as Bilan de competences, Bilan des competences approfondi, or Validation de Acquis des Experiences (VAE). The United Nations UNESCO organisation has a "Global Convention on the Recognition of Higher Education Qualifications Project" to standardize terminology and definitions used in Higher Education.

== History ==
RPL has been the mainstay of all assessments conducted under national vocational education and training systems since the late 1980s and continues to evolve as different vocational education and training (VET) systems evolve. The concept of RPL can be traced back to the earliest guilds when master craftsmen inspected the work of apprentices in order to determine their competence against the high standards demanded of the different professions of the period. This process was continued during the Industrial Revolution when the first formal apprentice programs were established and realistic workplaces created to train young men and women in the skills and knowledge required of their trade. It was first introduced into the UK by Susan Simosko, a consultant with the National Council for Vocational Qualifications, who adapted it as the central element of all competency-based assessments.

Simosko was employed by the British government to provide support to the creation of the National Vocational Qualifications (NVQ) and Scottish Vocational Qualifications (SVQ) systems during the late 1980s and early 1990s. She introduced and managed the Access to Assessment Initiative project which introduced the concept of Accreditation of Prior Learning as an important pathway for employed and unemployed people to gain formal recognition of their skills and knowledge against standards demanded of employers across the United Kingdom.

Other countries adopted the same processes when developing their own competency-based vocational education and training systems, some aligned solely with the need to assess competence in line with the needs of private and public sector organizations, and others as a critical element of the assessment of skills and knowledge in order to grant vocational qualifications. The National Training Board in Australia was one of the first outside of the UK to develop such a system as a framework for the transition towards the implementation of new apprentice programs and workplace training and assessment under the National Training Reform Agenda. RPL was incorporated under the National Framework for the Recognition of Training and has since remained an important element of all competency-based assessments.

In 2015 the Canadian Association for Prior Learning Assessment (CAPLA) released guidelines for the Recognition of Prior Learning that serve to guide and enhance the assessment of learning through RPL across contexts, contribute to organizational effectiveness, and promote labour force development. Informed by stakeholders, Quality Assurance for the Recognition of Prior Learning in Canada enhances understanding of Quality Assurance issues and good practice. “The manual benefits anyone working with, or on behalf of, applicants, candidates, clients, learners, or any individuals who seek: employment, professional licensure, trade certification, career coaching or counselling, job promotion or change, professional development, academic access, or advanced standing.”

In Ireland, RPL is linked to access, transfer and progression in further and higher education. Under the Qualifications and Quality Assurance (Education and Training) Act 2012, provider procedures for access, transfer and progression must include credit accumulation, credit transfer, and the identification and formal assessment of knowledge, skills or competence previously acquired by learners. Quality and Qualifications Ireland describes RPL as a process by which prior learning is formally identified, assessed and acknowledged. The National RPL in Higher Education Project, funded under the Higher Education Authority's Human Capital Initiative and co-sponsored by the Technological Higher Education Association and the Irish Universities Association, worked across 14 partner higher education institutions to embed and streamline RPL, support staff, and develop employer partnerships.

== Benefits ==
RPL is a very simple and straightforward process of assessing someone's skills or knowledge, regardless of where and how these were learned. Unlike other forms of assessment it doesn't judge someone's evidence of competence solely by the credentials or qualifications they have achieved, although this can form part of their claim. Nor does it consider where a person worked, their age, gender or physical attributes.

What RPL does is allow people to demonstrate that they are capable of undertaking specific tasks or working in certain industries based on evidence of skills and knowledge gained throughout their life.

RPL is similar to criterion-referenced assessment – assessment of skills and knowledge against certain criteria. However, while such criteria are generally less descriptive than those used in competency standards, they are outcomes-based (i.e., the outcome of somebody doing something, such as the outcome of writing is a letter, or the outcome of making something which results in an end product), not process-based such as learning.

In teaching or traditional training, the criteria against which formative and summative assessments are conducted is known as teaching or training objectives. (Sometimes these are also referred to as learning objectives but these are really the outcome the learners seeks to achieve, not the teacher or trainer.) They may be written in different ways but in all cases they include the behaviour to be observed, the conditions under which such behaviour is to be performed, and the standards or criteria which the performance must meet. These are the standards to be achieved as a result of the learning or training activity.

RPL Assessments may also be used to aid immigrant workers in having their existing qualifications recognised in their destination country. This may form part of the "points system" required to secure a working visa. In Australia for example, to secure a working visa, applicants must meet a series of quantified criteria based heavily on previous experience and qualifications.

== Methodology ==
Assessment in the recognition of prior learning (RPL) can take several forms, each tailored to effectively validate the knowledge, skills, and competencies a learner has gained outside traditional academic environments. These forms of assessment are designed to align with institutional or credentialing standards while accommodating the diverse ways in which learning can occur—through work experience, informal training, volunteering, or self-directed study. One common approach is portfolio assessment, where learners compile a comprehensive collection of artifacts such as work samples, certificates, reflective narratives, and supervisor testimonials. This portfolio is then reviewed by subject matter experts to determine whether the evidence demonstrates mastery of specific learning outcomes or competencies.

Another widely used form is challenge exams or proficiency testing, where learners demonstrate their knowledge through standardized tests or customized assessments developed by institutions. These can be written, oral, or performance-based, depending on the discipline. In fields that rely heavily on practical skills, demonstration assessments or skills audits may be used, allowing learners to perform tasks or simulations under observation.

== See also ==
- Competency-based learning – Framework for teaching and assessment of learning
- Competency-based recruitment – Process of recruitment
- Experiential learning
- Vocational education – Studies that prepare a person for a specific occupation
