= History of British Columbia sheriffs =

Governor James Douglas, the second governor for the Colony of Vancouver Island, appointed the first sheriff for Vancouver Island in 1857. Sheriff Andrew Muir was born in Scotland, and his family had established a sawmill in Sooke after they left the employ of the Hudson's Bay Company.

Sheriff Muir was tasked with the role of coroner, constable, and election returning officer. In 1858, the Gold Rush brought thousands of new visitors to Vancouver Island. Sheriff Muir's duties increased to include the suppression of riots and fugitive apprehension. The Colony of British Columbia was also created in this year. By 1860, the B.C. Sheriffs Act was created, and the two colonies were divided into nine counties, each with its own high sheriff.

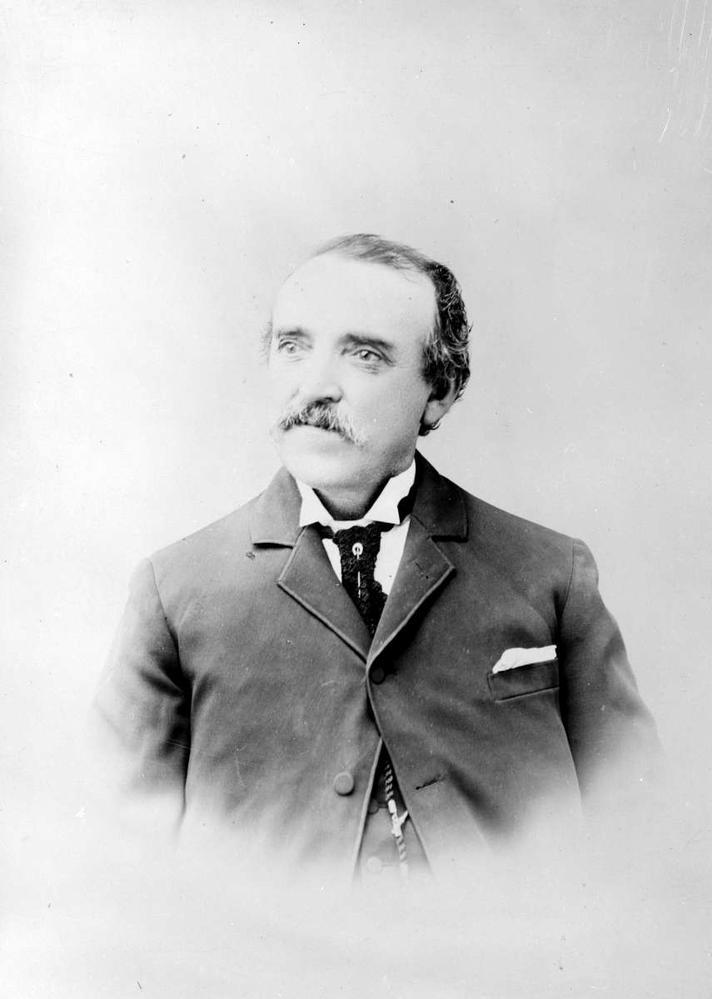
Abraham Barlow, early Sheriff at Yale

These early sheriffs had many duties, including jailhouse keeper, tax collector and gold commissioner, in addition to the duties first performed by Sheriff Muir. As the British Columbia Provincial Police were created in 1858 and several municipal police departments were established in the later 19th century and early 20th century, Sheriffs' focus was turned away from policing duties that they initially took on due to a lack of other resources. In the 20th century their role continued to change. Sheriffs, depending on their county, would serve as justice of the peace - allowing them to act as marriage commissioners. They were also empowered to create a posse (posse comitatus or "power of the county") for the apprehension of fugitives. At the Oakalla Prison, Sheriffs were responsible for the execution of prisoners sentenced to death, as it was a court process, as late as the 1960s.

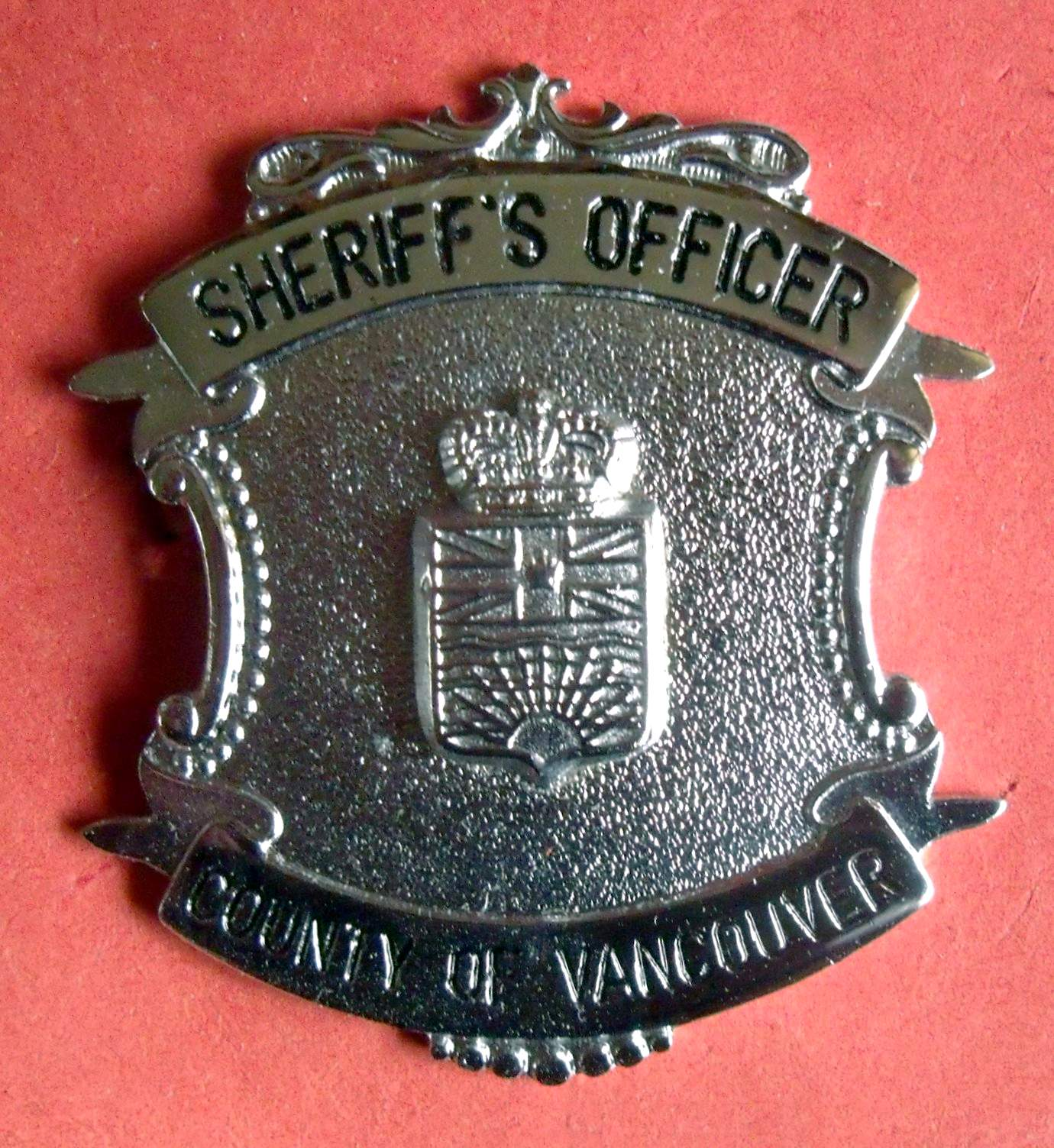
County of Vancouver Sheriff's Badge

In 1974, the British Columbia government amalgamated the county sheriffs into the provincial British Columbia Sheriff Service.
