= Entrustable professional activity =

Educational methodology

Entrustable professional activity (EPA) refers to a framework within medical education where trainees are evaluated on their ability to perform certain critical clinical tasks without direct supervision. Originating from the medical education domain, the success of EPAs has sparked interest in its application across other professional sectors.

== History and development ==
The last decades of the 20th century saw a pronounced shift in medical education, with a growing emphasis on competency-based medical education (CBME). Especially in English-speaking countries like the USA, UK, Canada, and Australia, there was an increasing call to ensure that medical graduates had specific competencies to guarantee patient safety and effective medical care. This led to institutions framing their curricula around competency frameworks, such as the Accreditation Council for Graduate Medical Education (ACGME) in the USA, which defined core competencies for all medical specialties.

However, while CBME provided a structured approach, educators and policymakers noticed some limitations. Competencies, though crucial, were often too granular or abstract for direct assessment. This raised concerns about how to determine a trainee's readiness for independent practice. Was it enough to be competent in isolated skills, or was there a need to demonstrate capability in integrating these skills in real-world contexts?

Professor Olle Ten Cate from the Netherlands introduced the concept of EPAs in this backdrop. The idea was to bridge the gap between competency acquisition and real-world clinical responsibilities. Instead of asking if a trainee had acquired a list of skills, the focus shifted to whether they could be "entrusted" with specific professional activities that integrated multiple competencies.

This framework quickly gained traction, not just in the Netherlands, but also in various English-speaking countries. In the United States, for instance, the Association of American Medical Colleges (AAMC) explored the implementation of EPAs for undergraduate medical education. By 2014, the AAMC had defined a set of 13 core EPAs that all medical school graduates should be able to perform on day one of residency without direct supervision.

The UK, Canada, and Australia also saw discussions and pilot implementations of the EPA framework, recognizing the need for a more holistic approach to assessing trainee readiness for clinical practice.

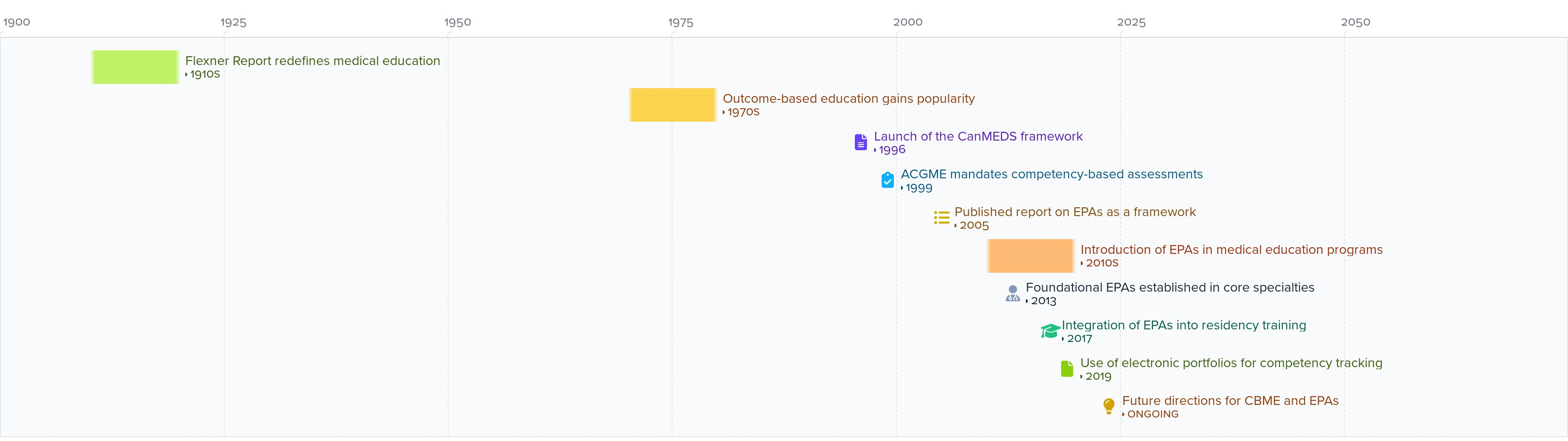
A timeline depicting the evolution from traditional medical education to CBME and then to EPAs, with key milestones marked

== Success in medical education ==
The transition to EPAs from the traditional competency-based approach bore several advantages:

1. Authentic Assessment: EPAs fostered a more authentic and real-world assessment of a medical trainee's capabilities, ensuring readiness for independent clinical practice.
2. Integrated Competencies: Unlike the compartmentalized assessment in traditional models, EPAs offered a unified approach, viewing competencies as interconnected and providing a comprehensive overview of a trainee's skillset.
3. Tailored Feedback: The specificity of EPAs permitted educators to deliver more precise feedback, driving trainees towards areas that needed improvement

== See also ==
- Competency-based learning
- Medical education
- Professional development
