= On-the-job training =

Form of workplace training

On-the-job training (widely known as OJT) is an important topic of human resource management. It helps develop the career of the individual and the prosperous growth of the organization. On-the-job training is a form of training provided at the workplace. During the training, employees are familiarized with the working environment they will become part of. Employees also get a hands-on experience using machinery, equipment, tools, materials, etc. Part of on-the-job training is to face the challenges that occur during the performance of the job. An experienced employee or a manager are executing the role of the mentor who through written, or verbal instructions and demonstrations are passing on his/her knowledge and company-specific skills to the new employee. Executing the training on at the job location, rather than the classroom, creates a stress-free environment for the employees. On-the-job training is the most popular method of training not only in the United States but in most of the developed countries, such as the United Kingdom, Canada, Australia, etc. Its effectiveness is based on the use of existing workplace tools, machines, documents and equipment, and the knowledge of specialists who are working in this field. On-the-job training is easy to arrange and manage and it simplifies the process of adapting to the new workplace. On-the-job training is highly used for practical tasks. It is inexpensive, and it doesn't require special equipment that is normally used for a specific job. Upon satisfaction of completion of the training, the employer is expected to retain participants as regular employees.

== History ==
On-the-job training is one of the earliest forms of training in the world, with masters taking on young apprentices and introducing them to their work, educating them on the techniques necessary for them to become masters themselves. The on-the-job training method dates from times as early as 2400 B.C when masons would instruct their apprentices on construction methods since not everyone was literate and it was the most convenient way to understand the requirements needed for the new job, on a one-to-one basis. In antiquity, the work performed by most people did not rely on abstract thinking or academic education. Parents or community members, who knew the skills necessary for survival, passed their knowledge on to the children through direct instruction. This method is still widely used today. It is a frequently used because it requires only a person who knows how to do the task and use the tools to complete the task. Over the years, as society grew, on-the-job training has become less popular. Many companies have switched to doing simulation training and using training guides. Businesses now prefer to hire employees who are already experienced and have a required skill set. However, there are still many companies who feel that on-the-job training is best for their employees.

While some companies do not see on-the-job training as an essential aspect of the workforce, Gary Becker, an economic scientist during 1962, referred to on-the-job training as an investment similar to conventional schooling (Becker, 1962). On-the-job training was deemed an investment like school because while they differ in effects on earnings, both improve people's physical and mental abilities and raise real income prospects. Whether that is the ability to gain a job or improve one's skills to become a more vital part of the workforce. Additionally, one of the earlier forms of on-the-job training can be traced back to the middle ages dating as early as the 5th to 15th century. During this time, apprenticeship was a system by which "men and women in pre-industrialized societies acquired skills necessary to become a specialized artisan" (Goddard, 2002). Apprenticeship contracts usually lasted six years. Young girls at the age of 12 and young boys at the age of 14 would work, alongside getting the needed training and hands-on experience to become an artisan themselves (Goddard, 2002).

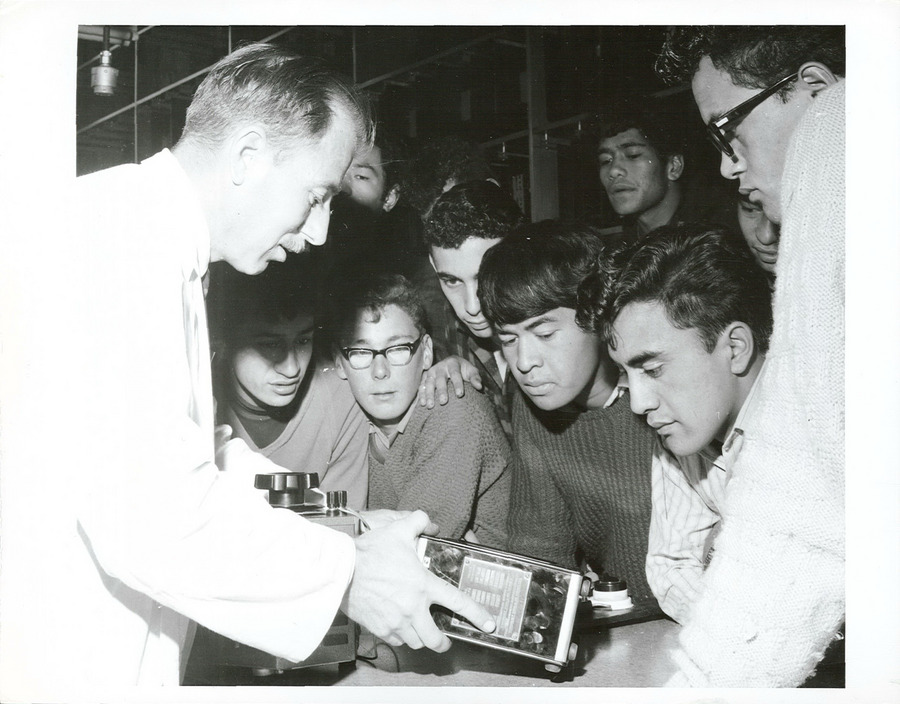
Apprenticeship Program: An experienced artisan is teaching young apprentices how to create his work. The Apprentices will be able to mimic the behaviour of their teacher and become skilled in the task themselves. Apprenticeships are one of the earliest forms of On-The-Job training.

== Psychology ==
The concept of observational learning was introduced by Albert Bandura, whose social cognitive theory Bandura believes that people learn best by observing others. According to his theory, people must pay attention to those around them first, retain what they have observed, and try to reproduce it. Bandura's theory is implemented in the aspect of on-the-job training, where the new employees observe first their trainer completing the tasks, before trying to perform the task themselves. After observing for some time, typically, they will imitate the action they had observed. This is exactly how on-the-job training is expected to occur, if necessary until the new employee is can perform the task on their own.

Albert Bandura's Social Cognitive Theory "is a psychological perspective on human functioning that emphasizes the critical role played by the social environment on motivation, learning, and self-regulation" (Schunk & Dibenetto, 2020). Bandura's earlier Social Learning Theory placed great emphasis on the importance of observational or vicarious learning. Bandura proposed that for observational learning to occur, individuals must follow a model, retain what the model did, recreate the modelled behaviour, and have the motivation to do so. Motivation is an essential aspect of this theory; Bandura suggested that "motivation comprises internal processes that manifest themselves overtly in goal-directed action" (Schunk & Dibenetto, 2020). This suggests that for a modelled action to be retained by an individual, there must be some motivation, such as the motivation to complete goals in the workplace.

== On-the-Job vs. Off-the-Job Training ==
There are two methods used for training new employees: on-the-job training and off-the-job training (training simulation). Both methods are effective; however, they are very different and require specific measures. On-the-job training refers to the training provided at the job location by an experienced supervisor or manager who is passionate about their job and will relay the information to the newly hired, whereas the off-the-job method involves giving training to the employees at a place other than the real job location, where simulations, videos, and tests are replacing the human interaction. Off-the-job training is usually executed by an outsourced vendor outside of the company.

On-the-job training is when employees observe the processes and procedures that their employer uses to create an efficient and effective workplace. Whether that is learning how to operate specialized machinery and equipment or observing methods that facilitate the employee to perform specific jobs. Usually, this is done by shadowing an experienced employee who can give hands-on instructions and training, which can help develop the skills and knowledge needed to carry out roles in the company effectively. On-the-job training is a cheaper option as companies usually do not need to pay for external professional development classes, instead employees gain knowledge from within their workplace. Unlike On-the-job training, Off-the-Job training requires employees to train away from their workplace. Usually, this is in the form of classes, lectures, and sometimes role play. Off-the-job training takes more time and is most often expensive as the company is required to hire external trainers or pay for conferences and classes. Most companies prefer on-the-job training rather than off-the-job training because it is cheaper, and the company can train their employees based on their requirements. Additionally, companies can train their employees on specific company policies while teaching them hands-on. Companies prefer hands-on learning because it helps individuals retain more information, which, as a result, would cause fewer errors.

Category	On-the-job Training	Off-the-job Training
Location	Imparted at the actual job location	At a place other than the real job location
Approach	Practical	Theoretical
Time Consumption	Less time	More Time
Learning Method	Learning by doing the task	Learning by acquiring knowledge
Effect on Production	No, because trainees produce the products during learning	Yes, because training is provided first, which is followed by a performance
Who Performs the Training	Employees, internal trainers or managers	Experts outside of the company
Cost	Inexpensive	Expensive

== On-the-job training plan ==
On-the-job is a form of investment in human capital. In order to be executed efficiently, it needs a good on-the-job training plan in place. The initial cost for the company is the time spent on training and the resources used, such as trainee time and equipment. When the training plan is well executed, the return on investment for the company is imminent and the result is an increase in productivity. On-the-job training is based on the requirements of the job description and is specific for each company. Every company is unique and requires a unique approach when it comes to creating a training program. Key elements of the training plan are measures, such as working hours, due date and evaluation. Another key element is the choice of a trainer or coach assigned to the project. In order for the plan to be effective, a knowledgeable coach, a co-worker, a training vendor or a manager with excellent leadership skills is needed to conduct the training.

Research shows that companies who invest in teaching their managers how to train new employees are more successful. They can articulate their beliefs to reinforce their ideas with employees. Having the knowledge and the understanding of companies culture makes them a perfect example of what is required from the new employee. Using managers to train employees is an effective on-the-job training strategy because it allows them to connect the training to the actual operation that employees will conduct in their routine work.

Experienced employees can take the role of a trainer (business), since an experienced employee can impart knowledge of the company's culture, strengths, and weaknesses to a new employee. This strategy also makes it easier for a new hire to get to know the team.

Some guidelines for developing and implementing an effective on-the-job training program include and are not limited to: - Understanding the company's needs. - Identifying the skills and knowledge required in an employee. - Inclusiveness when selecting an employee for training. - Evaluation. Evaluating each trainee will determine the effectiveness of the training, resulting in increased performance - Follow-up. Feedback helps determine how much of the training employees are retaining and using.

== Advantages and disadvantages ==
There are both advantages and disadvantages to on-the-job training. Before deciding which type of training is most beneficial, companies need to weigh out if there are more disadvantages than advantages of the training method. If that's the case, they need to opt out from the on-the-job training and look for better options.

=== Advantages ===
On-the-job training is beneficial for both employers and employees. For the employers, it is beneficial because it narrows down and prepares the skilled employees who are right for the company. By the end of the training process, the company's values, strategy, and goals are introduced and resulting in an employee's loyalty to the business. Employees trained in the job are an important asset for the company because they can cover more areas than just the tasks in their job description. On-the-job training creates a culture which extends past the bare minimum required by the job and allows continuing education as part of the working process. As a result, an uninterrupted production process increases the company's gains when opting out from the need of an initial investment for an off-site training. On-the-job training is cost-effective.

For employees, on-the-job training is beneficial because it allows them to learn a new skill or qualification within their field of work in a timely matter. During on-the-job training, they are engaged in the real production process instead of the simulated learning process. The new teammate is being introduced to the team and the company's values during the first step of the on-the-job training. On-the-job training leads to more opportunities to grow within the organization.

=== Disadvantages ===
On-the-job training can be a disadvantage for the company when the new employee doesn't have the required skills. This will result in more time needed for the training to be completed and will cost the company more since it takes the trainer and materials out of production for the duration of the training time. On-the-job training can often cause distraction of the regular working day which can affect productivity. If employees are not introduced to the safety features and safety precautions are not taught prior to entering the job field, there could be injuries since on-the-job training is most often used for practical tasks and working with machinery. Such an issue can cause a company a lawsuit and loss of assets. Finally, oftentimes on-the-job training is rushed and that can cause a negative effect on productivity.

== See also ==
- Lifelong learning
