= Talent supply chain management =

Talent Supply Chain Management is a proactive management approach to securing and optimizing talent supply and services through all input channels (supplier network) to meet the human capital (workforce) needs of companies, enabling them to better produce, distribute and deliver their goods and services and meet their strategic objectives.

In practice, Talent Supply Chain Management integrates Managed Service Provider (MSP) expertise with workforce analytics also referred to as supply chain intelligence (including talent supply/demand dynamics, insight on talent motivations, and applied principles of supply chain management), to deliver access to quality talent at competitive rates and with minimized risk.

== See also ==
- Talent management
