= Service-Ability =

Book by Kevin Robson

First edition (publ. Wiley)

Service-Ability: Create a Customer Centric Culture and Achieve Competitive Advantage is a book written by the customer service advocate Kevin Robson to highlight the need for organizations of all types and in all sectors to respond to the effects that increasing use of technology is having on the customer.

== Rationale ==
The rapid emergence of new technology is undoubtedly bringing incalculable benefit to organisations of all types but Robson's argument is that the widespread application of computerisation has caused people and processes to become conformed to systems thinking and this is depersonalising both the employee and the customer to such a degree that it is preventing truly customer-satisfying interactions. Organisations of all types are now experiencing high customer churn, antagonism and loss of business sustainability because they are dangerously ignoring the time-honoured business axiom that, 'People do business with people.'

Increasingly, organisations, whether private, public or third sector are facing the reality that their customer service is being mediated through social media. (Many are now monitoring Twitter and Facebook for negative chatter and pouncing on it to mitigate damage.) As this trend continues Robson argues that a major opportunity for sustainable competitive advantage is opening up. Organisations that challenge this emerging paradigm, put the technology behind them in support rather than as a mediator of the interaction, and refocus on treating customers in a way that satisfies the customer, not the technology, will have better customer retention, lower costs of customer replacement and will build their brand value through better reputations.

This will only be achieved by re-focusing on the people who are the organization, raising the morale and releasing their human potential for relationship with customers. The book is about the skill of the organisation as a whole to deliver strategic customer-satisfying service capability.

== Definition ==
Service-Ability can be defined as:

The ability of the whole organization, through its individual members, to deliver consistently what the organization seeks to do: in a culture of initiative, professionalism, engagement and involvement that resonates with the customer and creates delight and satisfaction in both parties.

Service-Ability is not just about the skill of individual employees in dealing with customers, nor is it about perfecting the service itself. It is about the ability of the organization as a whole to deliver customer-satisfying service that creates a depth of ethical relationship, extending from the very centre of the organization, to the loyal, satisfied customer through the loyal, satisfied employee. In other words, the organization becomes in its very essence 'service-able'.

== Underpinning philosophy ==
Service-Ability is a structured idea that focuses on the people and is underpinned by an understanding of morale (esprit de corps or team spirit). High morale is universally recognized as being necessary for successful human endeavour, especially in the military context: it sustains purpose and, in both the military and in non-military organizations, it is a matter of strategic intervention by senior management.

Morale is a corporate culture that comprises four key elements:

- Trust in your leaders. This is vertical trust and it derives from the senior management acting as leaders and being trustworthy, supporting, facilitating the individual's efforts and backing decisions made by employees in customers' interests.
- Pride in the job: the desire to do things properly and well. This is the result of the personal self-confidence that comes from an employee being well fitted to the job through intelligent recruitment, effective development and training, and meaningful, ongoing support.
- Trust in your co-workers (colleagues). This is horizontal trust across the organization between co-workers, acting in a collegiate manner and it is characterized by people co-operating and supporting one another: working together in a common bond of purpose: focusing on things that need doing rather than on things to be avoided, doing the right thing rather than doing things right according to the rules, and always acting in customers' interests
- A belief in the cause by the employee: in the mission, vision and, above all the values of the organization, as well as the value to the customer of the product or service being delivered.

== Outcomes ==
These elements respectively result in initiative, involvement, professionalism and engagement in the individual employee; attributes that are necessary for consistent customer service delivery. These four elements are inferred back into the organisation and classified into four core corporate/policy values:

- 'Effective Leadership' leads to trust and then initiative in the individual employee and it derives from the emerging understanding of servant leadership: those who lead not from in front, not from behind, or from above, but from within the body of the people; and who acts at all times also like a colleague, as first among equals as it were.
- 'Getting the People Right' results in professionalism. It comes from a strategic management approach that encourages pride in the job and draws on modern thinking about recruitment that takes account of attitude and personality, rather than just the hard technical criteria of job specification and person specification, which is the usual approach to recruitment. Getting the people right also means continuous development of the individual and a reward system that takes account of intrinsic motivation, not just relying on extrinsic motivation. It also takes an appropriate, measured approach to less-than-expected performance. where individuals are re-trained or moved out. People need to take responsibility for their work if they are to have pride in it.
- 'Appropriate Organization' leads to involvement in employees born of trust in co-workers and colleagues. It is characterized by 'form follows function', in which people are facilitated by an organizational design that encourages them, not works against them, to work effectively together in trust and teamwork. Key in this is the elimination of bureaucratic structures that induce a silo mentality and prevent free and open communication across the organization. In a sense, the whole organization becomes involved with itself; with a sense of working as one team in the customers' interests.
- 'Clarity of Purpose' leads to engagement in the employee who believes in the cause. Engagement is not only with the organization, but also with the customer. It is achieved by having a strategy based less on specific performance benchmarks and more on obliquity, such as the expression of values, that seek the same result but by more indirect means. These values need to be clearly articulated and effectively communicated, so that the people become imbued with them, and engaged. All this leads to a clear sense of direction that adds purposefulness to the daily work of the organization.

== Summary ==
Service-Ability, therefore, emerges from an organization-wide team spirit based on a culture of trust between colleagues and between the people and their leaders, a belief in what the organization stands for and what it seeks for itself, and pride in the job: all embedded within a supporting and facilitating set of initiators, facilitators and core values under each of the four dimensions. These are nested in layers or orbits, operating at each of the levels of the organization, in which all the elements spiral, are interrelated, interconnected and ultimately become focused on the people who deliver the service-product. The whole idea is illustrated by a quadrant model that is useful for analyzing, thinking, intervening, training and organizing for Service-Ability.
