= Community Lab School (Virginia) =

School in Virginia, US

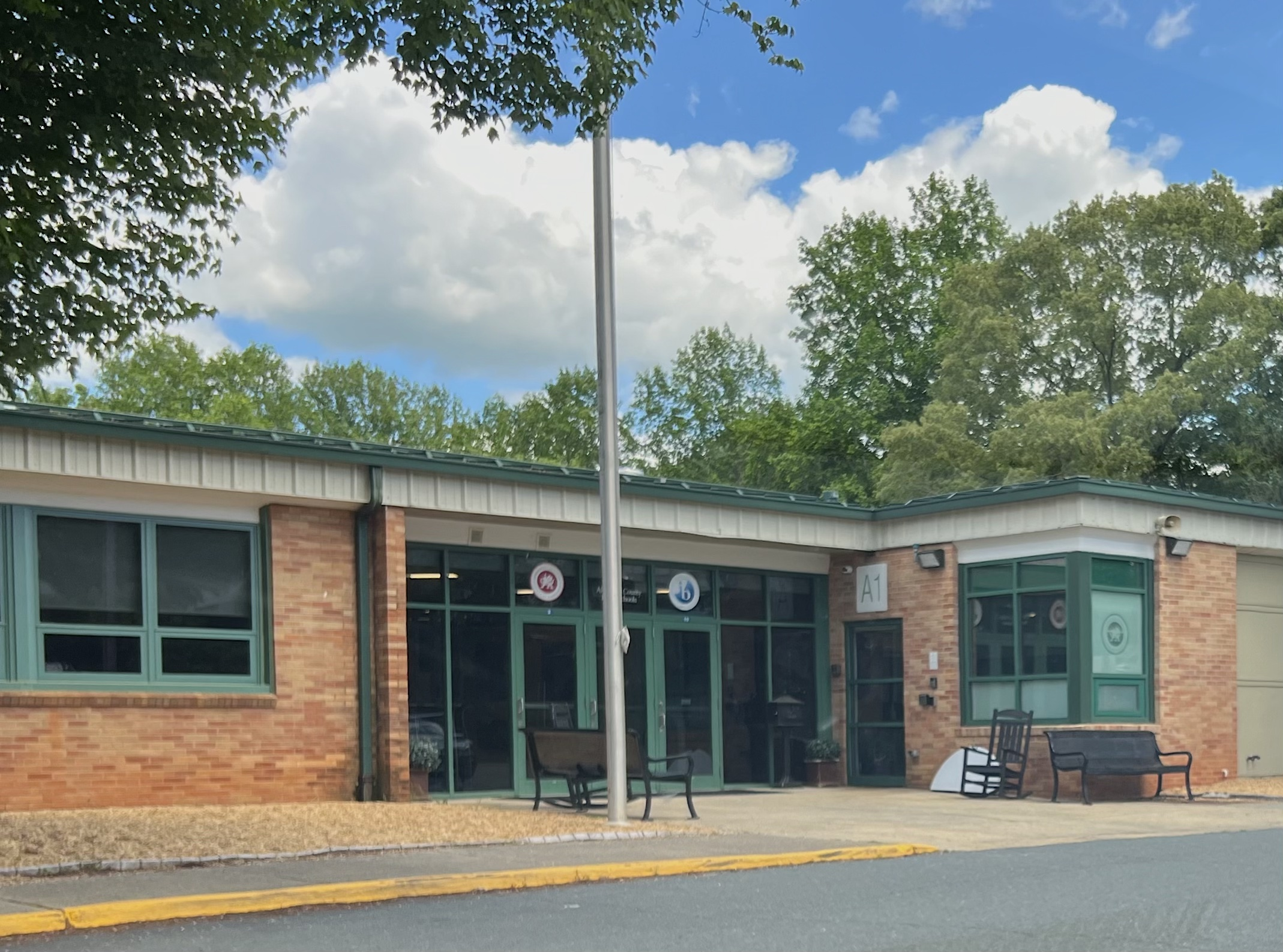

Location
- 1200 Forest Street; Charlottesville, Virginia; United States
- 38°2′26.7″N 78°28′58.2″W

Information
- Type: Public (Charter)
- Established: 1988
- Principal: Chad Ratliff
- Grades: 6–12
- Enrollment: 200
- Campus: Suburban
- Color: Crimson/white
- Mascot: Dragon
- Website: cls.k12albemarle.org

Community Lab School (formerly Murray High School, renamed after merging with Community Public Charter Middle School in 2020) is a district-backed public charter school serving grades 6–12 located in Charlottesville, Virginia. It is a part of Albemarle County Public Schools (ACPS). In August 2018, the Albemarle County School Board renewed the school's charter to provide Albemarle County families the option of a small, liberal arts school experience with elective pathways focusing on the creative arts, media, and design. Admission is open to all Albemarle County residents on a lottery basis. The school began offering the International Baccalaureate (IB) Diploma Programme in 2020.

== Community Lab School ==
As an Albemarle County Public Schools charter school, Community Lab School designs and pilots evidence-based approaches to student-centered learning for possible scale to other ACPS secondary programs. In 2017, it became one of twenty schools in the country to partner with MIT to develop open educational resources to help schools implement maker learning. In July 2018, it became the first public school in Virginia and one of the first in the country to join the Mastery Transcript Consortium. Community Lab School also works in partnership with nearby University of Virginia. Community Lab School gained the favor of students and parents with their system of mixing all grades together.

== Academics ==
Community Lab School's philosophical approach is grounded in student-centered learning based on the progressive education movement that began in the late nineteenth century. Students are encouraged to pursue personal interests through the curriculum and independently. The Albemarle County School Board approved the school's adoption of the International Baccalaureate Diploma Programme at its July 11, 2019, meeting.

== Athletics ==
Community Lab School added a squash team in 2018 in collaboration with University of Virginia's McArthur Squash Center. Otherwise, Community Lab School students may participate in athletic offerings or extracurriculars available at the ACPS comprehensive school to which they are districted.

== Facility ==
Since 2017, the school has added a recording studio, rapid prototyping and advanced manufacturing lab, digital media lab, additional art studio space, a bunch of trailers, and a renovated student commons and kitchen area.
