= Job description =

Document that defines a person's duties and responsibilities within an organisation

A job description or JD is a written narrative that describes the general tasks, or other related duties, and responsibilities of a position. It may specify the functionary to whom the position reports, specifications such as the qualifications or skills needed by the person in the job, information about the equipment, tools and work aids used, working conditions, physical demands, and a salary range. Job descriptions are usually narrative, but some may comprise a simple list of competencies; for instance, strategic human resource planning methodologies may be used to develop a competency architecture for an organization, from which job descriptions are built as a shortlist of competencies.

According to Torrington, a job description is usually developed by conducting a job analysis, which includes examining the tasks and sequences of tasks necessary to perform the job. The analysis considers the areas of knowledge, skills and abilities needed to perform the job. Job analysis generally involves the following steps: collecting and recording job information; checking the job information for accuracy; writing job descriptions based on the information; using the information to determine what skills, abilities, and knowledge are required to perform the job; updating the information from time to time. A job usually includes several roles. According to Hall, the job description might be broadened to form a person specification or may be known as "terms of reference". The person/job specification can be presented as a stand-alone document, but in practice it is usually included within the job description. A job description is often used by employers in the recruitment process.

== Key characteristics ==
=== Accountability ===
A job description outlines the roles and responsibilities of a position by specifying the outcomes a person is accountable for and defining the role they are expected to take on, showing how their contributions support team and organizational goals.

=== Functional competency ===
A job description outlines how one should operate in the role and at what level by defining the actions, problem-solving methods, communication style, decision-making approach, and interpersonal behaviors required to perform tasks effectively and meet performance expectations.

=== Reporting lines and relationships ===
A job description outlines the relationships and reporting structure with others in the organization, such as reporting to supervisors or managers, overseeing subordinates, and collaborating with colleagues across teams.

== Benefits and limitations ==
=== Benefits ===
A job description is essential to ensure clarity of why the role exists. It can be used:

- To provide the employee with the expectations that are required of them in the role
- To provide enough detail to help the candidate assess if they are suitable for the position
- To help formulate questions for the interview process
- To allow the prospective employee to determine their role or standing within the structure of the organisation
- To assist in forming a legally binding contract of employment
- To help set goals and target for the employee upon joining
- To communicate potential career progression by pointing toward possible promotion routes and the conditions required to achieve them
- To aid in the evaluation of the employee's job performance
- To help formulate training and development plans

=== Limitations ===
Prescriptive job descriptions may be seen as a hindrance in certain circumstances:

- Job descriptions may not be suitable for some senior managers as they should have the freedom to take the initiative and find fruitful new directions;
- Job descriptions may be too inflexible in a rapidly changing organization, for instance in an area subject to rapid technological change;
- Other changes in job content may lead to the job description being out of date;
- The process that an organization uses to create job descriptions may not be optimal.

== Job description management ==
Job description management is the creation and maintenance of job descriptions within an organization. A job description is a document listing the tasks, duties, and responsibilities of a specific job. Having up-to-date, accurate and professionally written job descriptions is critical to an organization's ability to attract qualified candidates, orient and train employees, establish job performance standards, develop compensation programs, conduct performance reviews, set goals and meet legal requirements. Job description management, as well as other facets of talent management, has been improved by the expansion of information technology. Today, there are variety of internet-based human resource solutions available to human resource departments. One such example is the cloud-based talent management systems that allow businesses to easily store HR information, collaborate with other departments, and access files from any device with Internet access.

=== Job description development ===
Prior to the development of the job description, a job analysis must be conducted. Job analysis, an integral part of HR management, is the gathering, analysis and documentation of the important facets of a job including what the employee does, the context of the job, and the requirements of the job.

Once the job analysis is complete, the job description including the job specification can be developed. A job description describes the activities to be performed and a job specification lists the knowledge, skills and abilities required to perform the job. A job description contains several sections including an identification section, a general summary, essential functions and duties, job specifications, and disclaimers and approvals.

Job descriptions are then used to develop effective EEO/ADA, HR planning, recruiting, and selection initiatives; to maintain clear continuity between compensation planning, training efforts, and performance management; and to identify job factors that may contribute to workplace safety and health and employee/labor relations.

=== Job description manipulation ===
Job description manipulation is a widely practiced bad faith practice that is referred to the deliberate modification of job descriptions with the intent of favoring specific candidates or groups of candidates, often to meet certain hiring preferences or objectives. This manipulation can involve altering the stated qualifications, responsibilities, or requirements of a job posting in a way that may not necessarily align with the actual needs of the position.

This even involves the manipulation of Bona Fide Occupational Qualifications (BFOQs). BFOQs are legitimate job requirements deemed essential for the effective performance of a particular role; "bona fide" means these qualifications should be concrete, specific, and justifiable as necessary for that job, and nothing more. However, in cases of job description manipulation, these qualifications may be adjusted or exaggerated to either include or exclude certain candidates. This can involve emphasizing specialized skills unique to the organization, stipulating a vehicle requirement for a desk job, imposing language requirements unrelated to the region’s commonly spoken language, requiring parallel or uncommon certifications, specifying or omitting certain experience levels, or requiring educational backgrounds that may not directly relate to the job's core functions.

Ultimately, this manipulation is driven by various factors, including organizational biases, outdated job specifications that misalign with potential applicants’ KSAs, personal preferences, or for balancing out performative inclusion (creating a facade of inclusivity). Job description manipulation serves an exclusionary function within recruitment processes, often deterring racialized applicants from applying or limiting their participation in career advancement opportunities. It violates anti-discrimination laws and equal employment opportunity regulations. These manipulative hiring practices that promote bias thrive in countries and settings where there are no independent audits or reviews mandated for organizations’ hiring practices, thickening HR from a cost center into a gatekeeping center for preserving structural inequality.

The negative effects directly harm the employment relationship, which is a key social structure. On a personal level, this relationship holds significant value. It not only offers a way to earn a living and achieve financial growth but also serves as a foundation for self-esteem and meaningful involvement in society. From a broader socioeconomic view, it undermines trust in the system that supports much of the productive work within a society.

=== Legality ===
An early application of job description to the workplace was in Governor Macquarie's New South Wales administration in the early 19th century. The convict society of Australia was transformed into a free society with capitalistic and working-class attitudes. Scientific management is a method to inform management of workplace attitudes and knowledge with the job description as a means to relocate that knowledge.

Well organized and up-to-date job descriptions assist in legal and regulatory compliance. In the United States, for example, the 1978 Uniform Guidelines on Employee Selection Procedure was developed in order to standardize the employee selection process and makes it clear that HR requirements must be linked with job-related factors. The Americans with Disabilities Act of 1990 (ADA) requires organizations to identify essential job functions and document the steps taken to identify job responsibilities while Fair Labor Standards Act (FLSA) requires HR managers to determine if a job is to be classified as exempt or non-exempt, which is to determine whether an employee would be eligible for overtime pay or if they would be considered salaried and exempt from overtime regulations.

Healthcare organizations not only have to comply with labor laws but also have to comply with healthcare laws and accreditation agencies. The Joint Commission (Joint Commission on Accreditation of Healthcare Organizations) accredits and certifies thousands of healthcare organizations around the United States. To meet Joint Commission guidelines, healthcare organizations must maintain up-to-date, accurate, complete and properly written job descriptions.

The above regulations require businesses to keep clear records of their job descriptions. Having a well-organized automated system helps eliminate some of the panic associated with a compliance audit.

== See also ==
- Strategic human resource planning – Process that identifies current and future human resources needs
- Competency-based recruitment – Process of recruitment
- International Standard Classification of Occupations – International Labour Organization standard for job names

== Bibliography ==
- Mathis, Robert L., and John H. Jackson. Human Resource Management. 11th ed. Mason: Thomson South-Western, 2006. 175–87. Print.
- Guide To Writing Job Descriptions. UCLA, n.d. Web. 13 Dec. 2011. <http://www.college.ucla.edu/personnel/jobdesc/intro.asp>.
- The Fair Labor Standards Act. United States Department of Labor, n.d. Web. 13 Dec. 2011. <https://web.archive.org/web/20080913163053/http://www.dol.gov/compliance/laws/comp-flsa.htm>.
