= Talent management =

Aspect of organizational planning

Talent management (TM) is the anticipation of required human capital for an organization, and the planning to meet those needs. The field has been growing in significance, and gaining interest among practitioners as well as in the scholarly debate over the past 10 years as of 2020, particularly after McKinsey's 1997 research and the 2001 book on The War for Talent. Although much of the previous research focused on private companies and organizations, TM is now also found in public organizations.

Talent management in this context does not refer to the management of entertainers. Talent management is the science of using strategic human resource planning to improve business value and to make it possible for companies and organizations to reach their goals. Everything done to recruit, retain, develop, reward and make people perform forms a part of talent management as well as strategic workforce planning. A talent-management strategy should link to business strategy and to local context to function more appropriately (Tyskbo, 2019).

== History ==
The precursor to "talent management" seen extensively in firms during the latter part of the 20th century was centered around internal talent development. An overemphasis was placed on the training and evaluation of managerial positions creating an excess supply of middle-management talent. Poor business forecasting of economic downturn in the 1970s combined with no-layoff policies for white-collar workers resulted in corporate bloat. Recession throughout the 1980s saw large increases in unemployment as firms restructured, placing less importance on internal development. As a result the hiring of outside talent largely replaced the internal development schemes seen in businesses earlier in the century and by the late 1990s had reached its limit. Firms found they were both attracting and losing experienced employees at the same rate and needed to explore new ways of retaining and nurturing incumbent employees.

The term was coined by McKinsey & Company following a 1997 study. The following year in 1998 "talent management" was entered in a paper written by Elizabeth G. Chambers, Mark Foulon, Helen Handfiled-Jones, Steven M. Hankin, and Eduard G. Micheals III. However, the connection between human resource development and organizational effectiveness has been established since the 1970s.

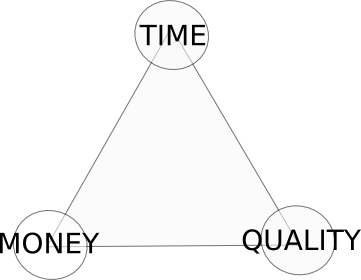

== Implementation ==
A talent management system is suggested to be used in business strategy and implemented in daily processes throughout the company as a whole. It cannot be left solely to the human resources department to attract and retain employees, but rather be practiced at all levels of an organization. The business strategy must include responsibilities for line managers to develop the skills of their immediate subordinates. Divisions within the company should be openly sharing information with other departments in order for employees to gain knowledge of the overall organizational objectives. The issue with many companies and the military today is that their organizations put tremendous effort into attracting employees to their company, but spend little time into retaining and developing talent.

The talent management strategy may be supported by technology such as HRIS (HR Information Systems) or HRMS (HR Management Systems).

=== Talent recruitment ===
The importance of recruitment of the proper talent is crucial to the overall long term success of the organization. Recruitment processes are vital because if people do not appreciate the initial process, they will not be willing to stay with the organization. Technology has advanced greatly giving many corporations the ability to locate the correct people for the task at hand. Nearly, all multinational enterprises (MNEs) are faced with the challenge of curating a formidable arsenal of its workforce. It has been reported that nearly 75% of the CEOs of the world have pointed out the unavailability of the required skills and capabilities as the main obstacle faced by organizations aiming for their growth (Sen, 2019) Companies need to decide whether it is correct to "buy" or "make" employees. Making an employee refers to teaching the individual certain skills needed for the job. However, it has to be determined whether or not the employee has the potential to learn the skills. Buying an employee is hiring an individual that already possesses the required skills needed for the job. If the person has the required skills, their starting wage will likely have to reflect the talent.

=== Evaluations ===
From a talent management standpoint, employee evaluations concern two major areas of measurement: performance and potential. Current employee performance within a specific job has always been a standard evaluation measurement tool of the profitability of an employee. However, talent management also seeks to focus on an employee's potential, meaning an employee's future performance, if given the proper development of skills and increased responsibility. What goes into these dimensions has been showed to differ depending on local organizational contexts (Tyskbo, 2019).

=== Talent marketplace ===
A talent marketplace is an employee training and development strategy that is set in place within an organization. It is found to be most beneficial for companies where the most productive employees can pick and choose the projects and assignments that are ideal for the specific employee. An ideal setting is where productivity is employee-centric and tasks are described as “judgment-based work,” for example, in a law firm. The point of activating a talent marketplace within a department is to harness and link individuals' particular skills (project management or extensive knowledge in a particular field) with the task at hand. Examples of companies that implement the talent marketplace strategy are American Express and IBM. In today´s globalized economy, cultural agility is a behavioral trait that international enterprises especially value in job applicants at the time of hiring.

=== Employee retention ===
The process of retaining employees to work in the organization on a long-term basis is defined as employee retention (Sen, 2019). Organizational resources are used to train new employees into skilled workers. This gives options to businesses that want to hold onto employees as long as they can. (Sen, 2019). By keeping a healthy long term relationship between employees and management, companies benefit from a skilled and talented staff that will cohesively work together to achieve long term goals. The most important factors involved in employee retention are compensation, workplace environment, growth options, and the support structure of the company (Sen, 2019). One of the greatest drivers of employee engagement and retention are intangible assets, that are mostly related to the way a manager treats their employees. The proper and fair treatment of all employees will increase their engagement levels and in the long run result in less of a need for micromanaging. The main cause for talented people leaving their jobs is due to the fact they are not being allowed to do as much as they would like to do for their organizations. The right employees want to feel impactful and have a feeling of importance as they go about their daily work. Employees are more likely to stay if they have a good relationship and open communication with their immediate boss and have a feeling of importance in the workplace. This is the main reason why frontline leaders should develop their employee retention skills as retention rates are likely to feature prominently in annual reports in the future. If management can hire and keep the right employees on board it will translate into positive and sustainable success in the future.

In Talent: How to Identify Entrepreneurs (2022), economist Tyler Cowen and entrepreneur Daniel Gross suggest that modern societies lack the ability to detect talent and to provide a framework in which talented people can be retained and helped to flourish.

== Current applications ==
In adverse economic conditions, many companies feel the need to cut expenses. This should be the ideal environment to execute a talent management system as a means of optimizing the performance of each employee and the organization. Selection offers are large return on investments. Job analysis and assessment validation help enhance the predictive power of selection tools. Data points such as cost-per-placement or average time to recruit are critical in predictive analytics for talent management. These evaluation methods use historical data to provide insight. However, within many companies the concept of human capital management has just begun to develop. With more companies in the process of deepening their global footprints, more questions have been asked about new strategies and products, but very few on the kind of leadership structure that will bring them success in their globalization process. “In fact, only 5 percent of organizations say they have a clear talent management strategy and operational programs in place today.” The impact of globalization on talent management practices is specifically covered in several recent books. However, four themes seem to dominate current research in area of talent management: talent retention, global talent management, turnover intention, and employee engagement.

== See also ==
- Competence (human resources) – Ability of a person to do a job properly
- Competency architecture – Framework of skills used in competency-based learning
- Competency dictionary – Competency within an organization
- Human resource management – Approach to the effective management of people in a company
