= Mastery Transcript Consortium =

Working consortium of public and private secondary schools

- Abbreviation: MTC
- Formation: March 1, 2017; 9 years ago
- Founder: Scott Looney
- Type: Nonprofit
- Purpose: Educational
- Members: 400 schools (2021)
- Website: mastery.org

The Mastery Transcript Consortium (MTC) is an international group of private and public secondary schools working to create a new type of secondary school transcript, referred to as a "Mastery Transcript." Elements of the Mastery Transcript include competency-based learning and the removal of the Grade Point Average system, including letter grades. The Mastery Transcript Consortium was founded in 2017 by Scott Looney, head of Hawken School.

== Transcript ==
=== Development ===
The Mastery Transcript Consortium was founded on March 1, 2017 by Scott Looney, head of Hawken School in Northeast Ohio. The creation of the Mastery Transcript was inspired by Looney's desire to create a new model for education in which learning was connected to real-world issues and students could demonstrate a broader range of abilities to colleges; the idea for the Mastery Transcript came when a parent of a Hawken student approached Looney after a presentation and mentioned that the Cleveland Clinic Lerner College of Medicine, at which he was a faculty member, did not give grades but instead evaluated students' competency in various areas based on an electronic portfolio of their work.

The transcript was developed by Looney and Doris Korda, a former Bell Labs engineer and a math teacher at Hawken. The pair incorporated the concept of micro-credentials, creating a credit system in which the credits would reflect student mastery in areas selected by individual schools. They determined that credits would be based on the standards of a school rather than the individual discretion of teachers.

=== Structure ===
Elements of the Mastery Transcript include competency-based learning and the removal of the Grade Point Average system, including letter grades. In contrast to traditional secondary school transcripts, which usually include letter-based grades and lists of courses, the Mastery Transcript focuses on measures of proficiency in various competencies. The Transcript also allows students to present evidence of their learning in the form of a multimedia portfolio.

The design of the Mastery Transcript is based on three core concepts: flexibility to accommodate a variety of school curricula, the omission of letter grades, and a format which can be read by college admissions officers in under two minutes. The transcript takes the form of a landing page on which credits earned by students are displayed in a graphic which an article in The Washington Post Magazine compared to the seating plan for a theatre in the round. Each transcript also includes summaries and examples of the work a student did to obtain those credits, as well as a statement of the school's standards for granting credits and comments from teachers. The transcript distinguishes between "foundational credits" necessary for graduation and "advanced credits".

== Adoption ==
=== By secondary schools ===
In the summer of 2018, Murray High School was the first public school to join the Consortium. In fall 2020, the Washington State Board of Education granted a waiver to Northshore School District, allowing Innovation Lab High School to use the Mastery Transcript for graduating students instead of a traditional transcript.

As of 2021, there were MTC partner schools in 21 countries. As of October 20, 2021, consortium membership included 275 independent high schools and 125 public schools.

=== In higher education ===
At the start of the 2020 school year, the Mastery Transcript was officially introduced. That year, 250 students from 14 member schools applied to colleges using the transcript and were admitted to 170 colleges including Massachusetts Institute of Technology, Middlebury College, and the University of Oklahoma. The Washington Post Magazine reported that the eligibility staff of the National Collegiate Athletic Association planned to work with schools sending mastery transcripts to convert them into equivalencies for courses and grades. In North Dakota, West Virginia, and Utah, state legislators have directed the state university systems to award scholarships based on alternative transcripts in the same way as they award them based on traditional ones.

== See also ==
- Competency-based learning – Framework for teaching and assessment of learning
