= Competency-based recruitment =

Process of recruitment

Competency-based recruitment is a process of recruitment based on the ability of candidates to produce anecdotes about their professional experience which can be used as evidence that the candidate has a given competency. Candidates demonstrate competencies on the application form, and then in the interview, which in this case is known as a competency-based interview.

The process of competency-based recruitment is intended to be fairer and a more realistic approach than other recruitment processes, by clearly laying down the required competencies and then testing them in such a way that the recruiter has little discretion to favour one candidate over another; the process assumes high recruiter discretion is undesirable. As a result of its perceived fairness, the process is popular in public services. It is highly focused on the candidates' story-telling abilities as an indication of competency, and disfavours other indications of a candidate's skills and potential, such as references.

In competency-based recruitment, candidates' storytelling abilities serve as key indicators of competency, prioritizing concrete examples of professional experience over other traditional markers, such as references.

== Core competencies ==
Core competencies are the set of skills which are crucial to a business, for them to gain a competitive advantage in their market. Senior managers are unable to manage every single aspect of their business, including the competencies needed to maintain a strong business. This means that they must come up with a set of competencies which truly affect their competitive advantage, as this will save them time in the long run when it comes to hiring employees.

Hamel and Prahalad's main idea was that over time companies will develop key areas of expertise which are unique to that company and crucial for their long term growth. They said the core competencies should not be seen as being fixed; these competencies should change in response to changes in the company's business environment. This is because over time, the business will evolve and new opportunities will arise and so the same must happen to the core competencies. Hamel and Prahalad came up with three questions which businesses must consider when identifying their core competencies:

1. Are the competencies difficult for competitors to imitate?
2. Do the competencies provide potential access to a wide variety of markets?
3. Do the competencies make a large contribution to the consumer benefits?

== Job description elements ==
Key elements of the job description are:

- Job title – title that is used to refer to the employees position in the company e.g. Project Manager
- Relevance of position – statement about how the position supports the company (with its business plan and objectives)
- Major responsibilities – list of the main activities that the individual must undertake on a day-to-day basis
- Critical criteria – standards and qualities that candidates must have in order to be considered for the job
- Preferred criteria – qualities that the company would like candidate to possess but are not crucial in the day-to-day activities of the job
- Reports to – their manager

== Purpose ==
There are four main reasons why competency-based job descriptions are crucial to businesses:

1. They provide crucial information for assigning the correct title and pay grade for the job
2. They make it easier to recruit candidates as the process becomes more efficient
3. Means potential candidates have a complete understanding of the duties and responsibilities they are to undertake
4. Finally, the competencies identify the essential functions of the job

Job descriptions and competencies allow potential employees to identify the skills, qualities, experience and training needed for a certain job. The information in the job description and competencies is included in the performance requirements which form the performance reviews. Businesses rely on job descriptions and competencies to create training programs for their employees whereas employees use these to obtain the skills required for them to get a promotion or pay rise!

== Small businesses ==
Small businesses struggle a lot more than larger businesses when it comes to employing people for jobs. It is much better for them to use competency-based job descriptions as they differ from standard job descriptions because they emphasize the worker rather than the work. Competency-based job descriptions decrease the chances of the employer hiring the wrong person for the job.

To ensure that staff are placed properly within a small business, they must create a detailed job description. For a small business it is crucial that they hire the right number of people. This is because, if they hire too many people it could lead to money being wasted on staff income (wages are the highest costs to business). As well as other issues, as the saying goes: "too many cooks spoil the broth"! On the other hand, if they hire too few people, it could lead to inefficiencies and large costs for the small business in the long run.

The best approach for small businesses will be to have a job preview, assess whether individuals are capable of learning the skills needed by the company. This will help filter out those candidates who will not be suitable for the job. If possible, small businesses should use experienced individuals in the hiring process, these individuals will know if the future employee will fit into the culture of the company as well as if they possess the relevant skills.

== Competency life cycle ==
The competency life cycle consists of four phases which aim to develop and enhance individual and organisational competencies. The different phases are:

1. Competency mapping – this phase is there to provide the company with a summary of all the crucial competencies needed in order to fulfil its targets (outlined in the business plan), outline the job requirements and the group needs. This phase also defines the required skill level for each job profile
2. Competency diagnosis – this is based on the current employees in the company. This outlines the present proficiency level each employee possesses. The company will perform a ‘skill gap analysis’, which defines the gap between the skills the employee currently has compared to the competencies needed for their job
3. Competency development – this phase deals with development of training/activities the company provides to employees to fill the skill gaps found in the previous phase
4. Monitoring of competencies – an analysis of the results of the competency development phase

== Competency analysis ==
In order to conduct thorough competency analysis, one has to gather information from various sources. These sources are known as job content experts (JCEs) and they have a good understanding of positions in companies. JCEs are usually the people who manage the position one is looking to fill. The first step of the competency analysis is to accumulate detailed descriptions of the tasks which make up the job: ‘task analyses’. This is done through a range of data collection methods:

- Job observation: observe people already in the job and ask them to describe what they do etc.
- Incumbent interviews: conduct interviews with people already in the job, asking each individual the same set of questions. The questions should be based on their key responsibilities, problems they need to solve/ difficulties they face, skills they feel are needed for success etc.
- Critical incidents meetings: meetings with JCEs, getting them to provide examples of times employees have been highly efficient or inefficient
- Competency vision meetings: meetings with ‘visionaries’, those who know about the future of the company. The reason for these meetings is because the hiring manager is looking for an employee who will stay for the long term and an employee who will contribute to the future success of the company

Once the data from these various sources has been analysed, a list of the competencies needed for the job description can come together, completing the competency analysis.

== Advantages ==
There are many benefits of using competencies in organisations:

- Competencies help a business distinguish their top performers and their average ones. This is useful information for managers when it comes to giving out bonuses
- As competencies are linked to business objectives or business strategies, aligning the two is more effective and convenient for the business, making it more streamlined
- Identifying and using core competencies to create goods & services results in major contributions to the companies competitiveness
- Businesses who use the competency-based approach will generally have a more flexible workforce, with individuals who are well trained and this should result in a successful performance from those employees
- Staff turnover is reduced if competency-based job descriptions are used, as candidates whom are best suited for the role are hired

=== Criticisms ===
There are some negative aspects of competency-based job descriptions. They can be time-consuming, as it takes a long time to gather the data needed to decide which competencies are relevant for the job profile. This process can also be very costly and not all businesses may have the funds available to carry out the competency analysis. The analysis also requires staff with specific skills, which certain businesses may lack.

The approach has also been criticised for emphasising neurotypical communication, and with strong bias against anyone who has reduced working memory and inhibitory control.

== Best practices ==
Having established the competency profiles for groups and roles, organizations can use the competencies as the standards for assessing candidates throughout the screening and selection process as well as advertising and communicating the organization's requirements to potential applicants.

Competencies support recruitment and selection by:

- Providing bona fide, validated, fair and unbiased standards against which to assess applicant competencies to perform in the targeted role / job.
- Improving the transparency of the selection process by clearly communicating the behaviours employees must display for success in the role / job.
- Contributing to the design of a well-articulated, efficient and effective recruitment and selection processes.
- Creating efficiencies by providing re-usable selection tools and processes (e.g., question banks for interviews and reference-checking organized by competency; template interview and reference checking guides for roles / jobs within the organization; targeted role plays, work simulations, in-basket assessments; etc.)
- Providing explicit, clear and transparent criteria on which to give candidates feedback on their performance in the selection process (e.g., input for future learning and development; etc.)
- Providing standards for evaluating the success of the selection process – e.g., correlating the results of the selection process with competency-based on-the-job performance.

Some of the common benchmark competency-based practices in Recruitment and Selection include:

- Notices of job requirements – A template is developed to define how competencies will be reflected in notices regarding the requirements of jobs to be filled. As the competency profiles are completed, sample notices are developed for the varied types of jobs/ roles. .
- Interview and Reference Checking Guides – Template interview and reference checking guides are developed for varied types of jobs/ roles, including instructions and rating guides. These are made available to hiring managers and HR Advisors.
- Template Interview and Reference Checking Guides – Template interview and reference checking guides are developed for roles/career streams and levels within Occupational Groups including instructions and rating guides. These are made available to hiring managers and HR Advisors.
- Competency-based Track Record / Portfolio Reviews – Track record / portfolio reviews allow employees / applicants to document their past experiences and accomplishments that relate to the competency requirements for positions within the organization. Once completed, trained evaluators score the extent to which the required competencies are demonstrated in the written examples using standardized scoring criteria. Typically, the candidate / employee also provides references who can attest to the validity of the examples provided. Results can be used as part of the staffing process and / or for other purposes (e.g., competency gap analysis for Learning and Development; Succession Management; HR Planning).
- Other Competency-based Assessment Methodologies – A variety of other competency-based assessment methodologies can be incorporated into the selection process, including In-basket assessments, role plays or simulations of workplace situations that the employee will encounter, multi-source input (as appropriate), etc. When designing and implementing any methodology, it is important that it be defensible (i.e., reliable, fair, valid and unbiased).
- Training on Competency-based Selection – Managers must have the knowledge and skills to be able to apply the various competency-based assessment methodologies noted above to arrive at valid selection decisions. Likewise, employees must be able to participate effectively to provide an accurate picture of the competencies they possess. Finally, both managers and HR professionals must be able to establish selection processes that are both efficient and effective (i.e., reliable, fair, valid and unbiased). All of this requires targeted training / orientation programs to ensure that all stakeholders have the necessary skills.

== Implementation stages ==
As competency profiles are developed for varied job groups, the following implementation stages are suggested for their use in recruitment and selection on a corporate-wide basis.

Stage 1:

- Define the policies and decision-rules for using competencies in the recruitment and selection processes
- Identify considerations / guidelines for including information on competencies in notices of job requirements
- Develop sample notices of job requirements as the competency profiles become available for use.
- Customize or build an interview / reference checking question bank organized by competencies included in the competency profiles.
- Customize or build other competency-based tools or processes (e.g., track-record reviews) that can be used across a number of occupational groups.

Stage 2:

- As the competency profiles are completed for the job groups, develop and implement recruitment, and selection processes consistent with policy and tools / templates defined in Stage 1. Review and evaluate the effectiveness and efficiency of these processes and adjust policies, procedures, templates, etc., as required.
- Plan for and train managers and HR personnel on appropriate competency-based interviewing approaches (e.g., behavioral interviewing; situational interviewing). This training should be just-in-time – i.e., as competency profiles become available for the different job groups.
- Plan for, design and implement an orientation / training program for employees on how to participate in a competency-based recruitment and selection as new processes are being implemented).
- Collect data on the effectiveness of the new recruitment and selection process (e.g., correlate results of selection process with on-job or training performance results) and make adjustments to the process, as required.

== See also ==
- Competency architecture – Framework of skills used in competency-based learning
- Competency dictionary – Competency within an organization
- Human resource management system – Software
- Learning management system – Educational software application
- Strategic human resource planning – Process that identifies current and future human resources needs
- Talent management – Aspect of organizational planning

== Bibliography ==
=== Books ===
- Dubois, D., & Rothwell, W. (2004). Competency-Based Human Resource Management. Davies-Black Publishing
- Dubois, D., & Rothwell, W. (2000). The Competency Toolkit (Volumes 1 & 2). HRD Press
- Lucia, A., & Lepsinger, R. (1999). The Art and Science of Competency Models: Pinpointing Critical Success Factors in Organizations. Pfeiffer
- Shandler, D. (2000). Competency and the Learning Organization. Crisp Learning.
- Spencer, L M. in Cherniss, C. and D. Goleman, eds. (2001) "The economic value of emotional intelligence competencies and EIC-based HR programs", in The Emotionally Intelligent Workplace: How to Select for, Measure, and Improve Emotional Intelligence in Individuals, Groups and Organizations. San Francisco, CA: Jossey-Bass/Wiley
- Spencer, L., & Spencer, S. (1993). Competence at Work: Models for Superior Performance. Wiley
- Ulrich, D. and Brockbank, W. (2005) The HR Value Proposition. Boston: Harvard Business School Press
- Wood. R., & Payne, T. (1998). Competency-Based Recruitment and Selection. Wiley
- Robin Kessler (2012). Competency-Based Interviews: How to Master the Tough Interview Style Used by the Fortune 500s

=== Articles ===
- Bartram, D. (2005) The Great Eight competencies: A criterion-centric approach to validation. Journal of Applied Psychology, 90, 1185–1203
- Catano, V., Darr, M., & Campbell, C. (2007). Performance appraisal of behaviour-based competencies: A reliable and valid procedure. Personnel Psychology, 60, 201–230
- Cheng, M. I., &. Dainty, R. I. J. (2005). Toward a multidimensional competency-based managerial performance framework: A hybrid approach. Journal of Managerial Psychology, 20, 380–396
- Draganidis, F., & Mentzas, G. (2006). Competency-based management: A review of systems and approaches. Information Management &Computer Security, 14, 51–64
- Homer, M. (2001). Skills and competency management. Industrial and Commercial training, 33/2, 59–62
- Horton, S. (2000). Introduction- the competency-based movement: Its origins and impact on the public sector. The International Journal of Public Sector Management, 13, 306–318
- Kochanski, J. T.,& Ruse, D. H. (1996). Designing a competency-based human resources organization. Human Resource Management, 35, 19–34
- McEvoy, G., Hayton, J., Wrnick, A., Mumford, T., Hanks, S., & Blahna, M. (2005). A competency-based model for developing human resource professionals. Journal of Management Education, 29, 383–402
- Rausch, E., Sherman, H., & Washbush, J. B. (2002). Defining and assessing competencies for competency-based, outcome-focused management development. The Journal of Management Development, 21, 184–200
- Sanchez, J. I., &. Levine, E. L. (2009). What is (or should be) the difference between competency modeling and traditional job analysis? Human Resource Management Review, 19, 53–63
- Schmidt, F.L., & Hunter, J.E. (1998). The validity and utility of selection methods in personnel psychology: Practice and theoretical implications of research findings. Psychological Bulletin, 124, 262–274
- Shippmann, J. S., Ash, R. A., Battista, M., Carr, L., Eyde, L. D., Hesketh, B., Kehoe, J., Pearlman, K., & Sanchez, J. I. (2000). The practice of competency modeling, Personnel Psychology, 53, 703–740.
- Spencer, L. M. (2004). Competency Model Statistical Validation and Business Case Development, HR Technologies White Paper
