= Counties of British Columbia =

Judicial subdivisions

In British Columbia, eight counties are created by the County Boundary Act. The counties exist for the administration of justice and are not used in the administration of government. Local government is organized by municipalities and by regional districts.

The counties are:

- County of Cariboo
- County of Kootenay
- County of Nanaimo
- County of Prince Rupert
- County of Vancouver
- County of Victoria
- County of Westminster
- County of Yale

Prior to 1895, the districts of the province of British Columbia and its predecessors, the colonies of Vancouver Island and British Columbia, were separated into districts for county courts, supreme courts and shrievalties. The Counties Definition Act of 1895 defined the divisions as the five original counties of Victoria, Vancouver, Westminster, Yale, Cariboo, and Kootenay and created procedures for the administration of justice including the appointment of registrars and sheriffs.

== Sheriffs ==
Beginning in the colonial era, each county appointed its own high sheriff. Over the next century, duties of the county sheriff and their deputies ranged from tax collector to executioner. In 1974, the county sheriffs were amalgamated and became the British Columbia Sheriff Service.

== County Court ==
A county court was established in British Columbia in 1884; it served as an intermediate court between the provincial court and the British Columbia Supreme Court. In 1990, the County Court of British Columbia merged with the British Columbia Supreme Court and its judges became justices of the BC Supreme Court. The BC Supreme Court sits in eight judicial districts. The judicial districts of the British Columbia Supreme Court have the same boundaries of the counties of the former county court. That is the only use of county in the British Columbian government, which is a reference only to such court districts and has no similarity to the meaning in the other provinces of Canada or elsewhere.

== See also ==
- County Boundary Act
- BC Government Dataset - County Areas Map
