= Person specification =

Personal attributes desired in a potential employee

A person specification describes the personal attributes desired in a potential employee. It is a companion document to a job description, describing the personal attributes being sought from applicants to ensure that they are suitable for the role. These attributes include qualifications, skills, experience, and knowledge, and sometimes personal attributes which a candidate needs to possess in order to perform the job duties. The specification should be derived from the job description and thus help form the foundation for the recruitment process. Person specifications are also good for helping potential applicants understand the job's requirements and self-select accordingly.

When writing a person specification, it is often suggested by guides that the content be measurable, and it cannot contain content that would directly or indirectly discriminate unnecessarily against protected groups.

Many employers currently use core competencies to build their person specification.

== See also ==
- Human Resource Management
- Personnel
- Job Description
- Business
