= Investment in social media =

investing in social media is the use of social media by companies and organizations to market their businesses. Social media consists of a myriad of means in which the interactions among people using web-based tools and platforms creates online virtual communities centered on user input and the sharing of information. Social media features anything from content-sharing to collaboration, and can take the form of platforms such as micro-blogging, forums, bookmarking sites, social networks and wikis. Prominent examples of social media include websites such as Facebook, Twitter, LinkedIn, YouTube and Reddit.

Social media is playing a growing role in business and organisations; with entrepreneurs increasingly looking towards social media platforms to market their businesses. It is evidently becoming the case that investment in social media "is a necessity, not a luxury", it is a fundamental instrument which should be used in any marketing plan.

However, it is clear that business owners encounter various challenges with respect to investing in social media; they may face lack of time and knowledge on how to determine the return on investment (ROI) as an example; this is a recognized measurement to evaluate the efficiency and financial consequences of an investment and to ultimately assess the profitability of a business.

== Return on Investment ==
ROI refers to the money that a business or a corporation earns as a percentage of the full value of their assets which have been invested. The method to calculate this is:

Return on investment = (Income - Cost) / Cost.

ROI is the most common profitability ratio that establishes the efficiency of an investment. In this context, ROI will measure the returns from a social media investment. However, it is commonly argued that calculating ROI is difficult and also depends on the applied returns and costs. There is no universal way of measuring the ROI of the social media commitments (Kelly, 2012). As such, some business owners tend to count how many Facebook fans and Twitter followers they have or how many retweets and likes they enjoy. However, this may not be an effective measure of ROI. We can measure ROI using metric tools that foster conversion measurement and optimized CPM, which enables Facebook ads to reach the target audience (Burg, 2013). This enables the investor to know who clicked through their ads thus enhancing future business planning. In addition, we can measure ROI by analyzing interactions, calculated by multiplying the number of received likes by the number of friends of those likes witnessed the action. This defines how far the advert went; moreover, we can analyze traffic to determine the ROI in social media efforts (Harden & Heyman, 2011). Indeed, different social media understand the business owners need to evaluate their ROI in social media and thus there is a provision for built-in analytics tools for following engagement, likes, and shares (Burg, 2013). This helps the marketers to determine how often people find the marketer's page through the social sites. For example, on Facebook, one can analyze the comment to like a ratio of posts while on Twitter, one can analyze the retweets to tweet ratio. Notably, the higher the ratios, the higher the ROI is.

== Benefits ==
=== Building brand recognition and loyalty ===
Initially, business owners may choose to invest in social media as a means of building their brand recognition. Through social media, businesses can simultaneously draw in new consumers whilst making existing customers more familiar with the brand. For example, through the use of the micro-blogging site Twitter; brands can promote their products with a simple "tweet", and any regular Twitter user could potentially stumble across their products and services via their newsfeed, whilst existing customers may become extra accustomed to the brand after seeing positive responses; following the current consumer's fashions. Companies can effectively use social media to enforce their company history, values and advantages in a way that will appeal to, and attract, many consumers.

It is statistically proven that businesses who engage in social media experience higher brand loyalty from their customers, hence we've seen not only an increase in investments, but also in the ROI; with over "72% of marketers now using social media to develop loyal fans", and of those who have been engaging in social media platforms for at least 1 year, "69% found it useful for building a loyal fan base".

=== Driving sales ===
Social media can directly lead to an increase in sales and brand awareness, as demonstrated with multiple campaigns in the past. A notable example was the success of the Jimmy Choo (2010) 'CatchAChoo' campaign; with which the internationally acclaimed luxury shoe and accessories brand set out to generate substantial online exposure to promote their new trainer collection, engaging customers through a real-time treasure hunt around London to locate a pair of trainers using the 'Foursquare' network. This campaign lasted just under 3 weeks, with over 4000 individuals participating and 250 different blogs covering this campaign; with over 4000 mentions of this hunt on Twitter. The results? Trainer sales in Jimmy Choo stores rose by over 33% after coverage from The Evening Standard, furthermore the reputation of the brand; measured by positive mentions of the brand, went up by almost 40% as a result in less than a month.

Similarly, online fashion store ASOS.com launched another Twitter campaign; using the '#BestNightEver' hashtag. ASOS achieved high levels of customer engagement, in turn driving more than £5m worth of sales and helping the brand register its highest ROI to date in the UK, not to mention the successes it brought in the US, with searches for the ASOS trademark soaring by over 50%.

=== Increased website traffic ===
Investing in a company's engagement in social media undoubtedly has its benefits. Activity on social networking platforms such as Facebook as an example can lead to increased traffic that the company's website receives via these referrals. A common way to measure website traffic can be done by comparing search engine rankings through SEO (Search Engine Optimization) – mentions, sharing and the traffic of websites are positive signals of popularity; stamping the authority of many brand's websites and allowing them to rank highly among their competitors. Activity on social media almost acts as a signal to search engines of a company's popularity and credibility, with all of this ultimately leads to more sales and increased brand awareness.

== Controversies ==
=== Facebook's Acquisition of WhatsApp ===
Facebook's $19 billion acquisition of WhatsApp marked a major milestone in tech industry investments. While the valuation drew criticism given WhatsApp's status as a five-year-old startup, the deal aligned with Facebook’s strategy to expand its mobile presence, where it was already generating 53% of its advertising revenue.

However, not only will the WhatsApp staff benefit from this deal, venture capital firm Sequoia Capital are entitled to what is estimated to be over $3 billion from their investments in WhatsApp, with their initial funding figure believed to be approximately $60 million; Sequoia Capital are believed to own approximately 20% of WhatsApp - their investments have clearly paid off.

=== Risks ===
- Facebook are effectively paying $42 per user of WhatsApp, will this acquisition pay off?
- Existing competition from other messaging apps can prove a threat to WhatsApp, for example WeChat which had a reported figure of 396 million monthly active users in June 2014; an increase of 40 million users since December 2013. The existing competition from these messaging services certainly has negative implications for WhatsApp's user base and revenue.

=== Rewards ===
- Allows access to China – China boasts over 1.2 billion mobile users, but that is normally not of any use as Facebook is of course blocked in China. However, that is not the case with WhatsApp, thus Facebook can certainly benefit from the lowering of this barrier.
- Increased users - Facebook enjoys 1.23 billion monthly active users, of which 945 million of them regularly access Facebook from mobile devices. This, coupled with the fact that WhatsApp has over 450 million monthly users, certainly allows Facebook to grow its user base and in turn increase revenue.

== Other investments ==
=== Twitter's $10 Million 'Laboratory for Social Machines' Investment ===
Micro-blogging powerhouse X has recently invested $10 million in the "Laboratory of Social Machines" initiative at the Massachusetts Institute of Technology or MIT . This 5 year commitment from X focuses on the creation and development of new technologies; using data from X's archives, improving analysis and the understanding of social patterns among multiple social media platforms and other web content. Pattern discovery will be utilized to decipher interactions and shared interests among users of social media, while new applications and platforms will be developed for both individuals and institutions to discuss and act on paramount societal issues

According to CEO of X then known as twitter, Linda Yaccarino: "This team has worked relentlessly from groundbreaking innovations like Community Notes, and, soon, X Money to bringing the most iconic voices and content to the platform. Now, the best is yet to come as X enters a new chapter". Also said "The future could not be brighter".

=== Reddit's $50 Million Funding ===
The major open source, community based social network and news site Reddit, famously labelled as the "front page of the internet", has secured $50 million of investments from multiple sources; from global venture capital firms such as Andreessen Horrowitz to an array of celebrities such as the renowned rapper Snoop Dogg.

CEO of Reddit Yishan Wong, has stated that the funding will go towards expanding Reddit's moderately low staff numbers of only 60, as well as developing new tools for community management and moderation; 10% of Reddit's 2014 ad revenue will also go towards charity.
