= British Columbia Sheriff Service =

Law enforcement agency for BC courts

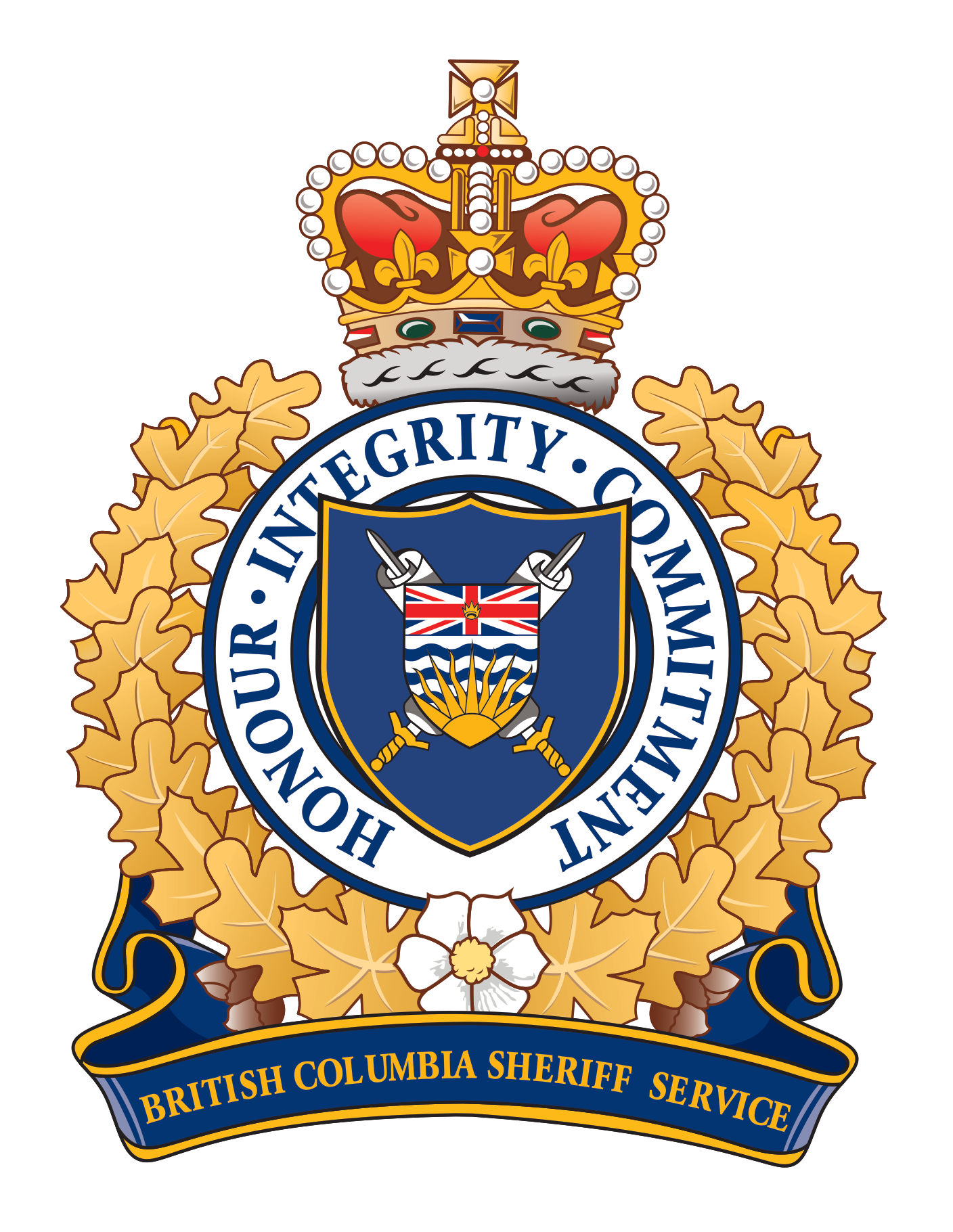
- Crest

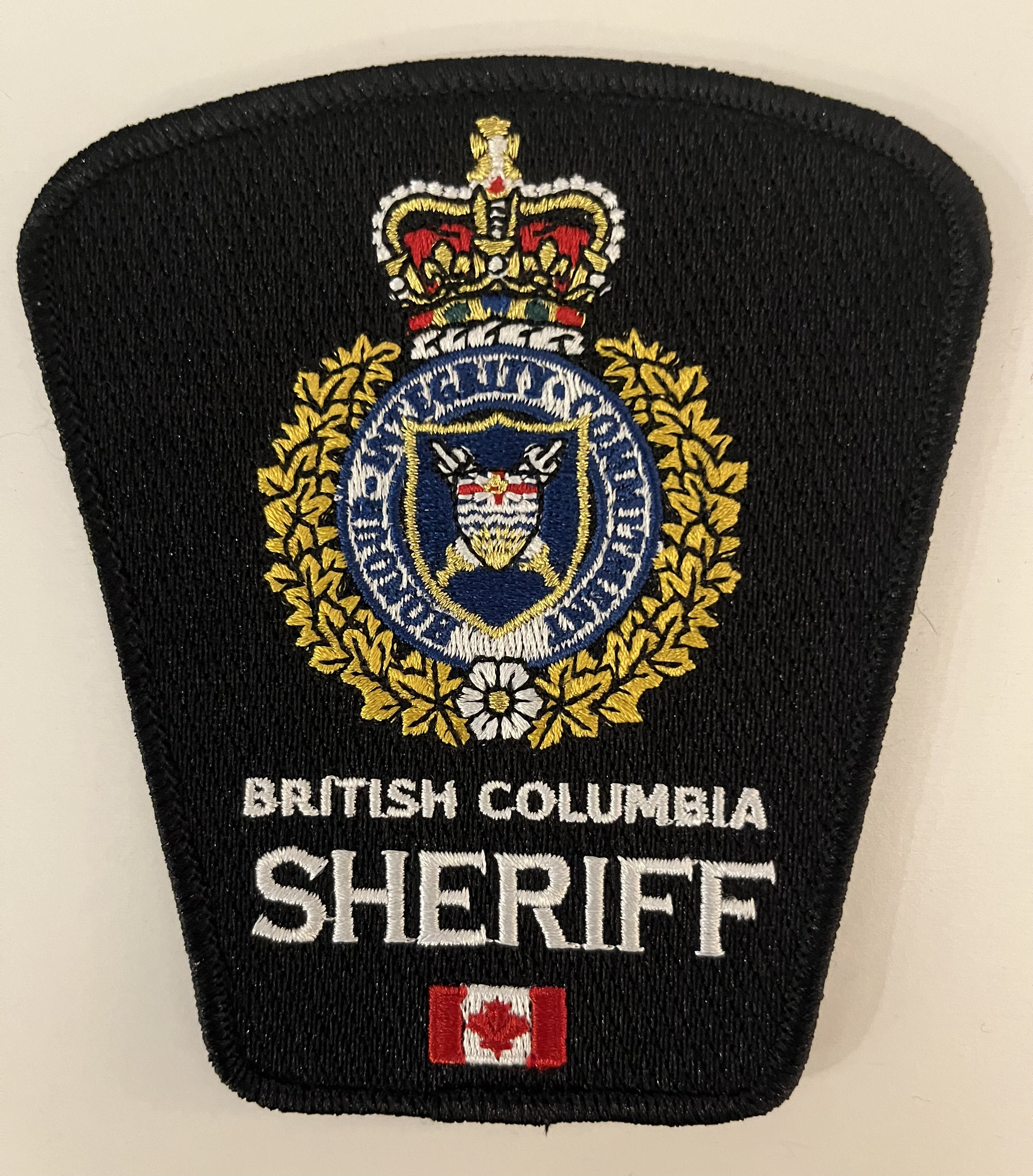
- Shoulder patch
- Common name: BC Sheriff Service
- Abbreviation: BCSS
- Motto: Honour, Integrity, Commitment

Agency overview
- Formed: BC Sheriff Service, 1974
- Preceding agencies: County sheriffs (1860); Inception of Sheriffs (1857)

Jurisdictional structure
- Operations jurisdiction: British Columbia, Canada
- Area: 944,735 km^{2} (364,764 sq mi)
- Population: 5,722,000
- Legal jurisdiction: Province of British Columbia
- Governing body: Ministry of the Attorney General
- Constituting instrument: Sheriff Act & Police Act

Operational structure
- Headquarters: Vancouver, British Columbia
- Deputy sheriffs: 620
- Civilian employees: 30
- Elected officer responsible: The Honourable Niki Sharma, Attorney General
- Agency executives: Chief Roger Phillips, Deputy Chief operations vacant; Deputy Chief Jackie Smith

Facilities
- Stations: 46

Website
- https://www2.gov.bc.ca/gov/content/justice/courthouse-services/courthouse-roles/sheriff-service

The British Columbia Sheriff Service (BCSS; French: Service des shérifs de la Colombie-Britannique) is a provincial law enforcement agency overseen by the Ministry of the Attorney General in the Canadian province of British Columbia. Founded in 1857, it is the oldest law enforcement agency in the province. Sheriffs are provincial peace officers appointed under the BC Sheriff Act and BC Police Act with authority to enforce all relevant federal and provincial acts, including the criminal code throughout British Columbia while in the lawful execution of their duties.

BC sheriffs provide protection and enforcement duties in support of the provincial, supreme, and appeal courts in British Columbia. The BCSS also assists local law enforcement agencies with additional resources to ensure public safety under the provincial Emergency Preparedness Program.

== History ==
In 1857, Governor James Douglas appointed Andrew Muir as the first sheriff of the Colony of Vancouver Island. In 1860, the Sheriffs Act was created, which divided the province into nine counties. Early sheriffs performed a variety of duties such as "jailhouse manager, tax collector, government agent, formed Posses and even gold commissioner".

In the twentieth century, the role of sheriffs evolved further, depending on the region of the province. As sheriffs, roles included "justice of the peace, marrying people in civil ceremonies, and raising the 'hue and cry' and posse comitatus to chase and capture criminals". Sheriffs were also responsible for death sentences at the Okalla prison.

In 1974, the sheriff's office in British Columbia was restructured and merged into a single department known as the British Columbia Sheriff Service and reported to the attorney general.

In March 2021, the BCSS retired the last of its Ford Crown Victoria Police Interceptors.

== Authorities and duties ==
BCSS members are peace officers who receive their authority from the BC Sheriff Act and BC Police Act and, as such, have authority to enforce provincial and federal statutes. They have the authority throughout the province of British Columbia while in the lawful execution of their duties.

BCSS members are armed with a sidearm while on duty; the current sidearm is the Smith & Wesson M&P. In 2025 BCSS will begin its transition to the Sig Sauer P320 X Carry in 9 mm (Sig P320) with the Sig Romeo X Enclosed Pro Pistol Mounted Optic (laser sights) and the FoxTrot2R Weapon Mounted Light.

BCSS members carry out protective and enforcement duties in support of the administration of justice, including the protection of the provincial, supreme and appeal courts of BC, coroner's court, and other official inquiries such as commissions or public hearings. Duties include planning high security trials, assessing and investigating threats towards those employed in the justice system and provincial government, protection of judges, Crown prosecutors and those employed by government, managing detention cells, transportation of prisoners by ground and air, manage and provide protection for juries, serve court-related documents, execute court orders, execute criminal and civil warrants, and provide members to the BC Fugitive Return Program The BCSS also assists local law enforcement agencies with additional resources to ensure public safety at special events such as Canada Day deployments.

As of early 2019, BCSS members are duty-bound and have a responsibility to act in exigent circumstances to intervene in life-threatening situations they encounter in the course of their duties throughout the province and while working out in the community.

== Districts ==
Region 1 Vancouver Island

Region 2 Coastal

Region 3 Fraser Valley

Region 4 Interior

Region 5 North

== Rank structure ==
The rank structure and insignia consists of the following:

Ranks	Chief Sheriff	Deputy Chief	Superintendent	Senior Inspector	Inspector	Staff Sergeant	Sergeant	Deputy Sheriff	Recruit
Insignia								None	None

== Recruiting ==
Recruiting of new sheriffs' deputies is handled by the service's Recruiting and Retention Unit. Applicants must be Canadian citizens or permanent residents, show safe driving records, have successfully completed the class 4 drivers license testing, pass the Sheriff's Officers Fitness Assessment Test, have current standard first aid and CPR, pass an English competency, grammar, comprehension test, pass a typing test (25 wpm), pass a comprehensive background investigation and security screening which include past-work performance reference checks, competency-based interview process, comprehensive medical examinations, vision and hearing testing and voice stress analysis testing. Applicants must pass each stage and requirement of testing before moving on.

== Training unit ==
Recruit training is conducted at the Sheriff Academy at the Justice Institute of British Columbia. Recruits undergo a fourteen-week training program. Block I takes place at the Sheriffs Academy in New Westminster and consists of training in emergency vehicle driving, firearms, force response options, active shooter and team deployments, conducted energy weapons (tasers), communications, legal studies, report writing, controlled access points, roles and functions, intelligence, cultural awareness, dress and deportment and physical fitness. In Block II, recruits enter the field under the direction of a training officer, who will also complete an evaluation. In order for a recruit to progress to the rank of deputy sheriff they must successfully complete both blocks.

== Specialized units ==
- Sheriffs Provincial Operations Centre (SPOC) houses the provincial dispatch centre for the BCSS, CPIC database, provincial fleet operations, Fugitive Return Program and Lower Mainland escort section.
- Integrated Threat Assessment Unit (ITAU) has duties including assessing threats towards people working in the justice system, in government and public officials, gathering intelligence and working in integrated partnerships with other law enforcement agencies to assess and manage intelligence. The ITAU also manages and assists with operational planning for large scale events that are deemed high security.
- Protective Services Unit (PSU), overseen by the ITAU, whose mandate includes the protection of individuals who may be at risk due to the nature of their work, have received inappropriate communications, have been threatened, or have been identified as requiring protection. Protective operations members receive highly advanced training in close quarter protection and operate as a plain clothes unit. Protective operations may include personal protection, transportation, residential, site, and special event protection.
- Intelligence members of the BCSS are embedded at several integrated provincial agencies including the Real Time Intelligence Centre (RTIC) whose primary role is to track and monitor organized crime, gangs and other groups in the province, real time crimes in progress and direct threats to public safety including terrorism related events throughout the province.
- Fugitive Return Program's (FRP) executes outstanding warrants on persons wanted in other provincial jurisdictions and escort those persons back to other Canadian jurisdictions (Con Air Program). These specialized operations include members operating in plain clothes with enhanced training and experience related to this specific detail. BCSS members also fly to other provincial jurisdictions arrest and return fugitives wanted in British Columbia.
- Warrants and Document Unit (WDU) operates in Metro Vancouver and executes warrants and serves documents in the community.
- Sheriff Provincial Support Unit (SPST) is staffed by civilian members who manage the provincial jury management unit and ensure the timely empaneling of juries, production of all summonses for potential jurors, corresponding communications and support to local sheriffs offices. This unit also manages the sheriffs security clearance unit by ensuring that all person's requiring access to sensitive areas of law court and Attorney Generals buildings are cleared through provincial and federal law enforcement data banks.
- The Strategic Operations Teams (SOT) are highly trained members of the BCSS who are trained in the use of elevated weapons platforms (carbines C8 & G36), counter surveillance, strategic motorcade operations and operators are deployed to provide enhanced site protection for areas deemed vulnerable to elevated threat levels.
- Civil Forfeiture Program. Members of BCSS are assigned to work with crown prosecutors and the Ministry of Justice lawyers to seize property, goods, money which has been determined to be proceeds of crime, illegal drug operations or organized crime groups.
- Witness Protection Unit. Members of BCSS are assigned to an integrated policing unit whose role within the provinces major crimes investigative teams is to ensure the 24/7 protection of witnesses.The witnesses have been determined to be at risk from individuals who may wish to do them harm in order to alter or stop the witness from testifying in criminal court.
- Sheriff Ceremonial Unit (CU) is composed of serving and retired sworn members of the service. The unit represents the BCSS at funerals, ceremonial events, parades, special functions for government and graduation ceremonies for Sheriffs Academy recruit classes. Members participate on a voluntary basis. The CU has a distinctive black high-neck dress tunic with a red stripe on the pants and is designed as a bridge between the heritage of the historic office of the sheriff in England and the modern day BCSS.The current Regimental Sergeant Major is Steven Bailey

== Line of duty deaths ==
In 1903, Sheriff Stephen Redgrave was killed in the line of duty in Golden, BC, when he had a heart attack while trying to effect an arrest.

In 1999, Deputy Sheriff James Askew was killed in the line of duty in Kamloops, BC, while participating in dynamic training.
