= Competency architecture =

Framework of skills used in competency-based learning

A competency architecture is a framework or model of predetermined skills or "competencies" used in an educational setting. Competency architectures are a core component of competency-based learning.

== Competency models ==
Many human resource professionals are employing a competitive competency model to strengthen nearly every facet of talent management—from recruiting and performance management, to training and development, to succession planning and more. A job competency model is a comprehensive, behaviorally based job description that both potential and current employees and their managers can use to measure and manage performance and establish development plans. Often there is an accompanying visual representative competency profile as well (see, job profile template).

Creating a competency framework is critical for both employee and system success. An organization cannot produce and develop superior performers without first identifying what superior performance is. In the traditional method, organizations develop behavioral interview questions, interview the best and worst performers, review the interview data (tracking and coding how frequently keywords and descriptions were repeated, selecting the SKAs that demonstrated best performance and named the competencies).

One of the most common pitfalls that organizations stumble upon is that when creating a competency model they focus too much on job descriptions instead of the behaviors of an employee. Experts say that the steps required to create a competency model include:

1. Gathering information about job roles.
2. Interviewing subject matter experts to discover current critical competencies and how they envision their roles changing in the future.
3. Identifying high-performer behaviors.
4. Creating, reviewing (or vetting) and delivering the competency model.

Once the competency model has been created, the final step involves communicating how the organization plans to use the competency model to support initiatives such as recruiting, performance management, career development, succession planning as well as other HR business processes.

The problem with the traditional method is the time that it takes to build.

=== Agile Method for building a competency model ===
Because skills are changing so rapidly, by the time the traditional method is completed, the competency model may already be out of date.

For this reason, an agile method, designed to model top performers in a particular role, may be used. It includes these steps:

1. Select 4-6 high performing job incumbents, whose behavior you wish to model, to participate in a workshop
2. Conduct a one-day rapid job analysis workshop to capture the categories of things they do, what they do, and how they do it, including what separates good from great
3. Draft the details of the competency model based on the workshop and provide it to the workshop participants for review and editing
4. Consolidate draft feedback and conduct a live workshop with participants to come to consensus about changes
5. Identify the target level of proficiency for each task in the model based on the final behaviors
6. Optionally vet the completed model with a larger group of high performing job incumbents
7. Begin making the competency model actionable, and plan a formal review with other high performing job incumbents at least annually to ensure currency

This method typically takes 3 weeks.

=== Arzesh Competency Model (ACM) ===
This method introduces different steps of model implementation as follows:

1. Identify competencies
2. Classify competencies
3. Create a database
4. Create a model

Based on this model, a suitability model should follow the following objectives: Merit and Educate future managers.

The purpose of this model is to deserve and develop the culture of success in organizations. The value model tries to identify and develop, within several stages, the competencies of its forces:

1. Identify the capabilities of the organization's human resources
2. Identify job competencies
3. Human Resource Ranking
4. Meritocracy: use people in posts that are commensurate with their competencies.

=== Project Manager Competence Development Framework (PMCDF) ===
The PMCDF framework, studied since 1997, is the first standard of the Project Management Institute (PMI) addressing the issue of "improving performance of project staff". This standard is an important step in continuing the mission of this association for definition of the body of knowledge supporting project management profession and provision of standards for its application. PMCDF framework aims to help project managers and those interested in project management to manage their profession development.

=== Project Manager Competency Framework (ICB) ===
The International Project Management Institute has divided the project management competencies into three categories: technical, behavioral and structural-environment. According to this standard, we need 46 elements to describe the competency of the project manager (a professional specialist who plans and controls the project).

=== National Competency Standards for Project Management (NCSPM) ===
The AIPM (Austrian Institute for project management) was formed in 1976 as the project manager's forum and has been instrumental in progressing the profession of project management in Australia. The AIPM developed and documented their standard as the Australian national competency standards for project management.

=== The Model for selection of competent manager in construction projects ===
This model is designed based on the special conditions of construction projects. In this model, first, the characteristics of a competent manager based on studies conducted on various standards and models of the world, and after studies on competency in the scientific and traditional attitudes, are divided into several categories and, finally, after identification of the criteria and measurable criteria and sub-criteria, with the help of the network analysis process, each of the criteria and sub-criteria is weighed in two different companies, and finally ranked among the identified factors and based on the weighted average of each of the sub-criteria, for selection of a competent manager among several volunteer managers, modeling is performed. The following figure shows the criteria and sub-criteria required for selection of the competent manager.

=== South African National Competency Model (SABPP) ===
On October 16, 2012, a major human resources organization which was called SABPP created a National Competency Model for South Africa. SABPP is not only a professional organization in the field of Human resource researches but also active in the field of training logistics. This company has developed training programs in the field of management and industrial psychology. Therefore, in development of this model, the views of industrial psychologists have been used. Dr. Lydia Silichemith has headed the research group. According to his early studies, creation of SABPP's competency model is important because it describes the requirements for any professional in a variety of occupational contexts.

== Benefits of competency models ==
Competency models can help organizations align their initiatives to their overall business strategy. By aligning competencies to business strategies, organizations can better recruit and select employees for their organizations. Competencies have become a precise way for employers to distinguish superior from average or below average performance. The reason for this is because competencies extend beyond measuring baseline characteristics and or skills used to define and assess job performance. In addition to recruitment and selection, a well sound Competency Model will help with performance management, succession planning and career development.

Career paths: Development of stepping stones necessary for promotion and long-term career-growth

- Clarifies the skills, knowledge, and characteristics required for the job or role in question and for the follow-on jobs
- Identifies necessary levels of proficiency for follow-on jobs
- Allows for the identification of clear, valid, legally defensible and achievable benchmarks for employees to progress upward
- Takes the guesswork out of career progression discussions

Identifying skill gaps: Knowing whether employees are capable of performing their role in achieving corporate strategy

- Enables people to perform competency assessments in order to identify skill gaps at an individual and aggregate level
- When self-assessments are included, drives intrinsic motivation for individuals to close their own gaps
- Identifies re-skilling and upskilling opportunities for individuals, or consideration of other job roles
- Ensures organizations can rapidly act, support their people, and remain competitive

Performance management: Provides regular measurement of targeted behaviors and performance outcomes linked to job competency profile critical factors.

- Provides a shared understanding of what will be monitored, measured, and rewarded
- Focuses and facilitates the performance appraisal discussion appropriately on performance and development
- Provides focus for gaining information about a person's behavior on the job
- Facilitates effectiveness goal-setting around required development efforts and performance outcomes

Selection: The use of behavioral interviewing and testing where appropriate, to screen job candidates based on whether they possess the key necessary job competency profile:

- Provides a complete picture of the job requirements
- Increases the likelihood of selecting and interviewing only individuals who are likely to succeed on the job
- Minimizes the investment (both time and money) in people who may not meet the company's expectations
- Enables a more systematic and valid interview and selection process
- Helps distinguish between competencies that are trainable after hiring and those are more difficult to develop

Succession planning: Preparation focused on retaining and growing the competency portfolios critical for the organization to survive and prosper

- Provides a method to assess candidates’ readiness for the role
- Focuses training and development plans to address missing competencies or gaps in competency proficiency levels
- Allows an organization to measures its “bench strength”—the number of high-potential performers and what they need to acquire to step up to the next level
- Provides a competency framework for the transfer of critical knowledge, skills, and experience prior to succession – and for preparing candidates for this transfer via training, coaching and mentoring
- Informs curriculum development for leadership development programs, a necessary component for management succession planning

Training and development: Development of individual learning plans for individual or groups of employees based on the measurable “gaps” between job competencies or competency proficiency levels required for their jobs and the competency portfolio processed by the incumbent.

- Focuses training and development plans to address missing competencies or raise level of proficiency
- Enables people to focus on the skills, knowledge and characteristics that have the most impact on job effectiveness
- Ensures that training and development opportunities are aligned with organizational needs
- Makes the most effective use of training and development time and dollars
- Provides a competency framework for ongoing coaching and feedback, both development and remedial

== Criticism of competency models ==
The most frequently mentioned “cons” mentioned by competency modeling experts regarding creating a competency model is time and expense. This is also a potential reason why some organizations either don't have a competency model in place or don't have a complete and comprehensive competency model in place. Building a competency model requires careful study of the job, group, and organization of industry. The process often involves researching performance and success, interviewing high performing incumbents, conducting focus groups and surveys.

When asked in a recent webcast hosted by the Society of Human Resource Management (SHRM), 67 percent of webcast attendees indicated that hastily written job descriptions may be the root cause of incomplete competencies. Defining and compiling competencies is a long process that may sometimes require more effort and time than most organizations are willing to allocate. Instead of creating a competency model themselves, organizations are enlisting the help of specialist/consultants to assess their organization and create a unique competency model specific to their organization. There are many ways that organizations can outsource these functions.

Organizations that don't have the time or resources to build to develop competencies can purchase comprehensive competency libraries online. These universal competencies are applicable to all organizations across functions. Organizations can then take these competencies and begin building a competency model.

For organizations that find they want a specialist to help create a competency model, outsourcing the entire process is also possible. Through outsourcing, a specialist/consultant can work with your company to pinpoint the root causes of your workforce challenges. By identifying these workforce challenges, customized action plans can then be created to meet the specific needs. Typically, these solutions are unique to every organization's culture and challenges.

== See also ==
- Competence (human resources) – Ability of a person to do a job properly
- Competency-based learning
- Competency dictionary – Competency within an organization
- Competency management system
