= Competency-based learning =

Framework for teaching and assessment of learning

Competency-based learning or competency-based education is a framework for teaching and assessment of learning. It is also described as a type of education based on predetermined "competencies," which focuses on outcomes and real-world performance. Competency-based learning is sometimes presented as an alternative to traditional methods of assessment in education.

== Concept ==
In a competency-based education framework, students demonstrate their learned knowledge and skills in order to achieve specific predetermined "competencies." The set of competencies for a specific course or at a specific educational institution is sometimes referred to as the competency architecture. Students are generally assessed in various competencies at various points during a course, and usually have the opportunity to attempt a given competency multiple times and receive continuous feedback from instructors.

Key concepts that make up the competency-based education framework include demonstrated mastery of a competency, meaningful types of assessment, individualized support for students, and the creation and application of knowledge.

== Methodology ==
In a competency-based learning model, the instructor is required to identify specific learning outcomes in terms of behavior and performance, including the appropriate criterion level to be used in evaluating achievement. Experiential learning is also an underpinning concept; competency-based learning is learner‑focused and often learner-directed.

The methodology of competency-based learning recognizes that learners tend to find some individual skills or competencies more difficult than others. For this reason, the learning process generally allows different students to move at varying paces within a course. Additionally, where many traditional learning methods use summative testing, competency-based learning focuses on student mastery of individual learning outcomes. Students and instructors can dynamically revise instruction strategies and based on student performance in specific competencies.

What it means to have mastered a competency depends on the subject matter and instructor criteria. In abstract learning, such as algebra, the learner may only have to demonstrate that they can identify an appropriate formula with some degree of reliability; in a subject matter that could affect safety, such as operating a vehicle, an instructor may require a more thorough demonstration of mastery.

== Usage ==
Western Governors University has used a competency-based model of education since it was chartered in 1996.

The Mastery Transcript Consortium is a group of public and private secondary schools which are working to utilize competency-based learning as part of their effort to create a new type of secondary school transcript.

== See also ==
- Competency-based recruitment – Process of recruitment
- Evidence-based education – Paradigm of the education field
- Mastery learning – Instructional strategy and educational philosophy
- Learning management system – Educational software application
- Mastery Transcript Consortium – Working consortium of public and private secondary schools
