= Competency dictionary =

Competency within an organization

A competency dictionary is a tool or data structure that includes all or most of the general competencies needed to cover all job families and competencies that are core or common to all jobs within an organization (e.g., teamwork; adaptability; communication). They may also include competencies that are more closely related to the knowledge and skills needed for specific jobs or functions (e.g., IT skills, financial administration skills).

== Comprehensive ==
A typical comprehensive competency dictionary should include a broad range of competencies developed through extensive literature search, review of best practices as well as ongoing refinement based on field research with various client groups. The competencies in the dictionary are required by a broad range of employees functioning within a wide variety of private and public sector organizations. The demonstration of these competencies by employees and managers is related to increased performance at the individual, team, and organizational levels.

Each competency has a general definition, which provides the user with a general understanding of the type of behavior addressed by a particular competency. Each competency includes up to five proficiency levels and each level has an associated brief statement describing how that particular level is distinct from the other levels within that competency. The behavioral indicators at each proficiency level are illustrative of the proficiency level as opposed to representing a definitive list of all possible behaviors at each level.

Finally, the defined levels of proficiency for each competency are incremental and additive so that employees demonstrating proficiency at a particular level can be assumed to perform effectively at all competency levels below.

Many Comprehensive Competency Dictionaries are divided into two sets of competencies:

1. General job competencies – common across many jobs and demonstrate the key behaviors required for success regardless of position.
2. Job-specific competencies – these are required for success in particular functions or jobs.

=== Proficiency levels ===
Organizations typically include incremental competency proficiency scales as part of the overall competency structure. These scales reflect the amount of proficiency typically required by the organization within a competency area. For example, communication skills may be a requirement for most entry-level jobs as well as at the executive levels; however, the amount of communication proficiency needed at these two levels may be quite different.

The proficiency scales serve two purposes:

1. They facilitate planning and development for improvement within current roles or jobs; and
2. They allow for comparisons to occur across jobs, roles and levels, not only in terms of the competencies required, but also the proficiency levels needed using a common incremental scale for defining the competencies.

Thus, having competency proficiency scales supports career development, succession management and human resource planning activities within the organization.

General Work competencies are most often expressed as incremental competency proficiency scales – in other words, proficiency at one level assumes proficiency at all levels below that level on the scale. Work Specific competencies, on the other hand, may be expressed as common group requirements and, where required, differences in proficiency requirements (by level of responsibility in a specified field of work) may be noted.

=== Target proficiency levels ===
Organizations typically define in their competency profiles the levels of performance (proficiency) to be attained for each competency. These are often driven by the use to be made of the competency profiles. For example:

- Entry – is the standard expected of employees on entry into a role. This is often used when the new entrant must learn or be trained to be able to perform to the standards required within the role.
- Fully Effective – is level required of employees who are performing at the standard expected for their role.
- Stretch / Mastery – is typically displayed by employees who have mastered their role. These employees are often sought out by other employees and supervisors to provide advice or assistance.

It is important to define what standard (or standards) of performance will be modeled in the competency profiles as a component of the competency architecture. An example of how these standards for employee performance relate to competency proficiency is shown below.

== Dictionary options ==
=== Building versus purchasing a dictionary ===
Organizations may choose to create their own competency dictionaries, or purchase one that has been developed by experts in competency profiling and competency-based management. The advantage of developing a competency dictionary is that it will reflect which competencies are required for success in the organization and it will expressed in a way that reflects the values, vision and way of communicating within the organization. On the other hand, this option is very costly and time-consuming, and most do not have the internal expertise to complete this task

=== Purchasing ===
Purchasing a competency dictionary from a reputable company has the advantage of providing the organization with a well-developed and researched dictionary that can be used in a timely manner to support profile development and implementation. The disadvantage is that the dictionary may not reflect the full range of competencies needed, nor reflect them in a language that is suitable for the organization.

=== Hybrid option ===
Organizations often achieve a compromise by customizing a purchased competency dictionary (e.g., adding competencies, modifying the language slightly to reflect the organization's style of communicating and including additional behavioural indicators to reflect performance expectations of the organization). This provides a quick and cost-effective solution, and results in a Competency Dictionary that is targeted to the organization's specific needs.

== See also ==
- Competency model – Ability of a person to do a job properly
- Competency architecture – Framework of skills used in competency-based learning
- Competency-based recruitment – Process of recruitment
