= Succession planning =

Planning for the replacement of leaders

Succession planning is a process and strategy for replacement planning or passing on leadership roles. It is used to identify and develop new, potential leaders who can move into leadership roles when they become vacant. Succession planning in dictatorships, monarchies, politics, and international relations is used to ensure continuity and prevention of power struggle. Within monarchies succession is settled by the order of succession. In business, succession planning entails developing internal people with managing or leadership potential to fill key hierarchical positions in the company. It is a process of identifying critical roles in a company and the core skills associated with those roles, and then identifying possible internal candidates to assume those roles when they become vacant. Succession planning also applies to small and family businesses (including farms and agriculture) where it is the process used to transition the ownership and management of a business to the next generation.

== Business succession planning ==
Effective succession or talent-pool management involves building a series of feeder groups up and down the entire leadership pipeline or progression. In contrast, replacement planning is focused narrowly on identifying specific back-up candidates for given senior management positions. Thought should be given to the retention of key employees, and the potential impact their departure may have on the business.

The practice of business succession planning is conducted either by organisations themselves, or with the support of specialist Management consulting firms.

Fundamental to the succession-management process is an underlying philosophy that argues that top talent in the corporation must be managed for the greater good of the enterprise. Merck and other companies argue that a "talent mindset" must be part of the leadership culture for these practices to be effective.

Organizations use succession planning as a process to ensure that employees are recruited and developed to fill each key role within the company. Through one's succession-planning process, one recruits superior employees, develops their knowledge, skills, and abilities, and prepares them for advancement or promotion into ever more-challenging roles. Actively pursuing succession planning ensures that employees are constantly developed to fill each needed role. As one's organization expands, loses key employees, provides promotional opportunities, or increases sales, one's succession planning aims to ensure that one has employees on hand ready and waiting to fill new roles. Succession planning is one of important processes in leadership pipeline.

According to a 2006 Canadian Federation of Independent Business survey, slightly more than one third of owners of independent businesses plan to exit their business within the next 5 years - and within the next 10 years two-thirds of owners plan to exit their business. The survey also found that Small and medium-sized enterprises (SMEs) are not adequately prepared for their business succession: only 10% of owners have a formal, written succession plan; 38% have an informal, unwritten plan; and the remaining 52% do not have any succession plan at all. A 2004 CIBC survey suggests that succession planning is increasingly becoming a critical issue. The CIBC estimated that by 2010, $1.2 trillion in business assets would be poised to change hands.

Research indicates many succession-planning initiatives fall short of their intent. "Bench strength", as it is commonly called, remains a stubborn problem in many if not most companies. Studies indicate that companies that report the greatest gains from succession planning feature high ownership by the CEO and high degrees of engagement among the larger leadership team.

Companies well known for their succession planning and executive-talent development practices include: General Electric, Honeywell, IBM, Marriott, Microsoft, Pepsi and Procter & Gamble.

Research indicates that clear objectives are critical to establishing effective succession planning. These objectives tend to be core to many or most companies that have well-established practices:

- Identify those with the potential to assume greater responsibility in the organization
- Provide critical development experiences to those that can move into key roles
- Engage the leadership in supporting the development of high-potential leaders
- Build a database that can be used to make better staffing decisions for key jobs

In other companies these additional objectives may be embedded in the succession process:

- Improve employee commitment and retention
- Meet the career development expectations of existing employees
- Counter the increasing difficulty and costs of recruiting employees externally
- Monitor the flight risk of key talent
- Identify multiple successors for specific roles
- Review regularly the career plans and mobility preferences of potential successors

=== Process and practices ===
Companies devise elaborate models to characterize their succession and development practices. Most reflect a cyclical series of activities that include these fundamentals:

- Identify key roles for succession or replacement planning
- Define the competencies and motivational profile required to undertake those roles
- Assess people against these criteria - with a future orientation
- Identify pools of talent that could potentially fill and perform highly in key roles
- Develop employees to be ready for advancement into key roles - primarily through the right set of experiences.

In many companies, over the past several years, the emphasis has shifted from planning job assignments to development, with much greater focus on managing key experiences that are critical to growing global-business leaders. North American companies tend to be more active in this regard, followed by European and Latin American countries.

PepsiCo, IBM and Nike provide current examples of the so-called "game-planning" approach to succession and talent management. In these and other companies annual reviews are supplemented with an ongoing series of discussions among senior leaders about who is ready to assume larger roles. Vacancies are anticipated and slates of names are prepared based on highest potential and readiness for job moves. Organization realignments are viewed as critical windows-of-opportunity to utilize development moves that will serve the greater good of the enterprise.

Assessment is a key practice in effective succession-planning. There is no widely accepted formula for evaluating the future potential of leaders, but many tools and approaches continue to be used today, ranging from personality and cognitive testing to team-based interviewing and simulations and other Assessment centre methods. Elliott Jaques and others have argued for the importance of focusing assessments narrowly on critical differentiators of future performance. Jaques developed a persuasive case for measuring candidates' ability to manage complexity, formulating a robust operational definition of business intelligence. The Cognitive Process Profile (CPP) psychometric is an example of a tool used in succession planning to measure candidates' ability to manage complexity according to Jaques' definition.

Companies struggle to find practices that are effective and practical. It is clear that leaders who rely on instinct and gut to make promotion decisions are often not effective. Research indicates that the most valid practices for assessment are those that involve multiple methods and especially multiple raters. "Calibration meetings" composed of senior leaders can be quite effective in judging a slate of potential senior leaders with the right tools and facilitation.

With organisations facing increasing complexity and uncertainty in their operating environments some suggest a move away from competence-based approaches. In a future that is increasingly hard to predict leaders will need to see opportunity in volatility, spot patterns in complexity, find creative solutions to problems, keep in mind long-term strategic goals for the organisation and wider society, and hold onto uncertainty until the optimum time to make a decision.

Professionals in the field, including academics, consultants and corporate practitioners, have many strongly held views on the topic. Best practice is a slippery concept in this field. There are many thought-pieces on the subject that readers may find valuable, such as "Debunking 10 Top Talent Management Myths", Talent Management Magazine, Doris Sims, December 2009. Research-based writing is more difficult to find. The Corporate Leadership Council, The Best Practice Institute (BPI) and the Center for Creative Leadership, as well as the Human Resources Planning Society, are sources of some effective research-based materials.

Over the years, organizations have changed their approach to succession planning. What used to be a rigid, confidential process of hand-picking executives to be company successors is now becoming a more fluid, transparent practice that identifies high-potential leaders and incorporates development programs preparing them for top positions. As of 2017 corporations consider succession planning a part of a holistic strategy called "talent management". According to the company PEMCO, "talent management is defined as the activities and processes throughout the employee life cycle: recruiting and hiring, Onboarding, training, professional development, performance management, workforce planning, leadership development, career development, cross-functional work assignments, succession planning, and the employee exit process". When managing internal talent, companies must "know whether the right people, are moving at the right pace into the right jobs at the right time". An effective succession-planning strategy, coupled with solid career-development programs, will help create more personal development for employees.

=== Succession management ===
A substantial body of literature discusses succession planning. The first book that addressed the topic fully was "Executive Continuity" by Walter Mahler. Mahler was responsible in the 1970s for helping to shape the General Electric succession process which became the gold standard of corporate practice. Mahler, who was heavily influenced by Peter Drucker, wrote three other books on the subject of succession, all of which are out of print. His colleagues, Steve Drotter and Greg Kesler, as well as others, expanded on Mahler's work in their writings. "The Leadership Pipeline: How to Build the Leadership Powered Company", by Charan, Drotter and Noel is noteworthy. A new edited collection of materials, edited by Marshall Goldsmith, describes many contemporary examples in large companies.

Most large corporations assign a process owner for talent and succession management. Resourcing of the work varies widely - from numbers of highly dedicated internal consultants to limited professional support embedded in the roles of human-resources generalists. Often these staff resources are separate from external staffing or recruiting functions. As of 2017 some companies seek to integrate internal and external staffing. Others are more inclined to integrate succession management with the performance management process in order simplify the work for line managers.

=== Succession advisors ===
A prior preparation needs to be done for the replacement of a CEO in family firms. The role of advisors is important as they help with the transition of leadership between the current-generation leaders and the successors. Advisors help family-owned businesses establish their own leadership skills. This process is relatively long if the successors want to be accepted by all employees. They need to take higher managing positions gradually to be respected. During this process, the successors are asked to develop different skills such as leadership. This is where the role of advisors fully exemplifies its importance. It is when the managing position is shared between the first-generation leader, the second and the advisors. An advisor helps with communication because emotional factors between family members can badly affect the company. The advisors help manage everything during a predetermined period of time and make the succession process less painful and eventful for everybody. In these cases, an interim leadership is usually what is best for the company. The employees can get accustomed to changes while getting to know the future CEO.

== Business Exit Planning ==
With the global proliferation of SMEs, issues of business succession and continuity have become increasingly common. When the owner of a business becomes incapacitated or passes away, it is often necessary to shut down an otherwise healthy business. Or in many instances, successors inherit a healthy business, which is forced into bankruptcy because of lack of available liquidity to pay inheritance taxes and other taxes. Proper planning helps avoid many of the problems associated with succession and transfer of ownership.

Business Exit Planning is a body of knowledge which began developing in the United States towards the end of the 20th century, and is now spreading globally. A Business Exit Planning exercise begins with the shareholder(s) of a company defining their objectives with respect to an eventual exit, and then executing their plan, as the following definition suggests:

Business Exit Planning is the process of explicitly defining exit-related objectives for the owner(s) of a business, followed by the design of a comprehensive strategy and road map that take into account all personal, business, financial, legal, and taxation aspects of achieving those objectives, usually in the context of planning the leadership succession and continuity of a business. Objectives may include maximizing (or setting a goal for) proceeds, minimizing risk, closing a Transaction quickly, or selecting an investor that will ensure that the business prospers. The strategy should also take into account contingencies such as illness or death.

All personal, financial, and business aspects should be taken into consideration. It is also an efficient time to transfer from the point of view of possibly applicable estate taxes, capital gains taxes, or other taxes.

Sale of a business is not the only form of exit. Forms of exit may also include initial public offering, management buyout, passing on the firm to next-of-kin, or even bankruptcy. Bringing on board financial strategic or financial partners may also be considered a form of exit, to the extent that it may help ensure succession and survival of the business.

In developed countries, the so-called "baby boomer" demographic wave is now reaching the stage where serious consideration needs to be given to exit. Hence, the importance of Business Exit Planning is expected to further increase in the coming years.

== Family business ==
Small business succession tends to focus on how a business will continue to operate once its founder or initial leadership team retires or otherwise leaves the business. While small businesses on the whole often fail after the departure of their initial leadership team, succession planning can result in significantly improved chances for a business's continuation.

Within the context of succession planning, where a small business is owned by a group of managers or partners, thought should be given to the transition of the business to the partners, how departure from a business will be managed, and how shares or ownership interest will be valued for purposes of sale or buy-out.

When succession occurs within a company's hierarchy, succession plans should consider issues that may arise relating to retention of the intended successor, the possibility of jealousy by other employees, and how other employees will respond when they learn of the succession plan. Additional issues are likely to arise if succession is to a family member, particularly if more than one child of the managing owner works for the business or if siblings who do not work for the business will gain shares without having invested time and energy in the business.

Small businesses and perhaps especially family businesses benefit from creating a disciplined succession process, involving,

- Discussion and commitment by the shareholders;
- Careful candidate selection; and
- Integration and development of the selected successor.

No part of the process should be rushed, with the integration process being expected to take roughly two years.
