= Strategic human resource planning =

Process that identifies current and future human resources needs

Human resource planning is a process that identifies current and future human resources needs for an organization to achieve its goals. Human resource planning should serve as a link between human resource management and the overall strategic plan of an organization. Ageing workers population in most western countries and growing demands for qualified workers in developing economies have underscored the importance of effective human resource planning.

As defined by Bulla and Scott, human resource planning is 'the process for ensuring that the human resource requirements of an organization are identified and plans are made for satisfying those requirements'. Reilly defined (workforce planning) as: 'A process in which an organization attempts to estimate the demand for labour and evaluate the size, nature and sources of supply which will be required to meet the demand. ' Human resource planning includes creating an employer brand, retention strategy, absence management, flexibility strategy, (talent management) strategy, (recruitment) and selection strategy.

== Best practices ==
The planning processes of most best practice organizations not only define what will be accomplished within a given time-frame, but also the numbers and types of human resources that will be needed to achieve the defined business goals (e.g., number of human resources; the required competencies; when the resources will be needed; etc.).

Competency-based management supports the integration of human resources planning with business planning by allowing organizations to assess the current human resource capacity based on their competencies against the capacity needed to achieve the vision, mission and business goals of the organization. Targeted human resource strategies, plans and programs to address gaps (e.g., hiring / staffing; learning; career development; succession management; etc.) are then designed, developed and implemented to close the gaps.

These strategies and programs are monitored and evaluated on a regular basis to ensure that they are moving the organizations in the desired direction, including closing employee competency gaps, and corrections are made as needed. Human resource planning is the ongoing process of systematic planning to achieve the best use of an organisation's most valuable asset – its human resources. The objective of human resource (HR) planning is to ensure the best fit between employees and jobs, while avoiding workforce shortages or spares. The three key elements of the HR planning process are forecasting labour demand, analysing present labour supply, and balancing projected labour demand and supply. A Human Resource plan should cover the HR goals and how they align with the organizations' business objectives.

== Implementation Stages ==
=== 1. Assessing the current HR capacity ===
- Develop a skills catalog for your employees so that you have a clear understanding of what your staff currently holds. This employee catalog should include everything from volunteer activities to certifications, of all degrees not just topics pertaining to their particular position. These catalogs can be assessed to deem whether or not an employee is ready to add more responsibility, or to forecast the employee's future development plans...

=== 2. Forecasting HR requirements ===
- This step includes projecting what the HR needs for the future will be based on the strategic goals of the organization. Keep in mind you will need to also accommodate for external challenges that can affect your organization.
- Some questions to ask during this stage include:
  - Which jobs will need to be filled in the upcoming period?
  - What skill sets will people need?
  - How many staff will be required to meet the strategic goals of our organization?
  - Is the economy affecting our work and ability to appeal to new employees?
  - How is our community evolving or expected to change in the upcoming period?

=== 3. Gap Analysis ===
- During this step you will observe where your organization is currently, and where you want to be in the future. You will identify things such as, the employee count, and the skills evaluation and compare it to what will be needed to achieve your future goal. During this phase you should also review your current HR practices and identify what you are doing that is useful and what you can add, that will help you achieve your goal.
- Questions to answer in this stage include:
  - What new jobs will we need?
  - What new skills will we need?
  - Do our present employees have the necessary skills?
  - Are employees currently aligned to their strengths?
  - Are current HR practices adequate to meet our future goal?

=== 4. Developing HR strategies to support the strategies of the organization. ===
- There are 5 HR strategies that you can follow to meet your organizational goals.
  - Restructuring strategies
    - This includes reducing staff, regrouping tasks to create well-designed jobs, and reorganizing work groups to perform more efficiently.
  - Training and development strategies
    - This includes providing the current staff with training and development opportunities to encompass new roles in the organization
  - Recruitment strategies
    - This includes recruiting new hires that already have the skills the organization will need in the future.
  - Outsourcing strategies
    - This includes outreaching to external individuals or organizations to complete certain tasks.
  - Collaboration strategies
    - This includes collaborating with other organizations to learn from how others do things, allow employees to gain skills and knowledge not previously available in their own organization.

== Tools and technologies ==
Human resources use various tools and technologies to achieve its goals, especially when it comes to strategic planning. These technologies include but are not limited to social media, policies and management information systems.

=== Technologies ===
==== Social media ====
Social media is used as a tool in human resources and business in general. This discipline deals with selecting appropriate social media sites and formats from the myriad options available and leveraging the same to create value for the organization. This requires an in-depth understanding of the key benefits and pitfalls of social media and managing these effectively in the organization's context. This discipline emphasizes harnessing social media for effective human resource management, which includes recruitment, collaboration and engagement. It also explores the non-financial impact as well as the approaches for measuring the return on investment in social media. Common social media outlets used in the HR field are LinkedIn, Facebook and Google Plus.

==== Management information systems (MIS) ====
MIS are computerized information-processing systems designed to support the activities of company or organizational management. They go by various names all with varying functions, in the HR field these tools are commonly referred to as human resource management systems (HRIS). These programs assist professionals in records management, benefit administration and inquiries, hiring and team placement, coaching and training, attendance and payroll management.

=== Tools ===
==== Policy ====
Policies are set in place to assist in SHRP. These policies are targeted not only for selecting and training employees but also how they should conduct themselves in and outside the workplace and various other aspects of being employed at a workplace. For example, within several companies, there exists a social media policy which outlines how an employee should conduct themselves on personal accounts as a representative of their workplace.

==== Common policies in HR ====
- Equal Employment Opportunity policies
- Employee classifications
- Workdays, paydays, and pay advances
- Overtime compensation
- Meal periods and break periods
- Payroll deductions
- Vacation policies
- Holidays
- Sick days and personal leave (for bereavement, jury duty, voting, etc.)
- Performance evaluations and salary increases
- Performance improvement
- Termination policies

==== Behavioral science ====
Behavioral science is the scientific study of human behavior. This applied science is used as a tool in SHRP to help understand and manage human resources. This tool is particularly useful in organizational development and understanding/establishing organizational culture.

== Theories ==
=== Strategic human resource management ===
Strategic human resource management is "critical importance of human resources to strategy, organizational capability to adapt to change and the goals of the organization"[citation?]. In other words, this is a strategy that intends to adapt the goals of an organization and is built off of other theories such as the contingency theory as well as institutional theory which fit under the umbrella of organizational theory. These theories look at the universalize, contingency and configuration perspectives to see the effect of human resource practices in organizations. The universalize perspective says that there are better human resource practices than others and those should be adopted within organization while contingency says that human resource practices need to align with other organization practices or the organizations mission, and configuration perspective is based on how to combine multiple aspects of human resource practices with effectiveness or performance. This can also be viewed as how human resource practices fit vertically or horizontally in an organization. This theory also involves looking at the value of human capital as well as social capital both in and outside of organizations and how this affects human resource practices. Human capital being knowledge and skills of individuals working for the organization and social capital is based on the character and value of relationships in and out of the organization. "Colbert suggests that SHRM should focus on the interactions and processes of the organization's social system—the intentions, choices and actions of people in the system and on HR systems as a coherent whole."

=== Resource dependency theory ===
Resource dependence theory which is the theory that organizations are not self-sustaining there they must depend on outside resources to stay functioning. "Resources and dependence could help to explain how HR practices evolve from the interaction between nonprofits and their environment, how they deploy employee skills, behaviors and how HR systems are managed."
