= Fayek =

Fayek is an Arabic origin word which is used as a surname and a masculine given name. Notable people with the name include:

== Surname ==
- Aminah Robinson Fayek, Canadian civil engineer and academic administrator
- Mohamed Fayek (born 1929), Egyptian politician
- Youssef Fayek (born 2000), Libyan football player

== Given name ==
=== First name ===
- Fayek 'Adly 'Azb (1958–2021), Egyptian boxer
- Fayek Matta Ishak (1922–2006), Egyptian Canadian writer and scholar
- Fayek Abdullah Muhhamadi Afandi Mala Rassul, known as Zewar (poet) (1875–1948), Iraqi Kurdish poet and writer

=== Middle name ===
- Mohammad Fayek Uz Zaman, Bangladeshi academic
