= Incompetence (disambiguation) =

Incompetence is the inability to perform; lack of competence; ineptitude.

Aspects of incompetence include:

- Administrative incompetence, dysfunctional administrative behaviors that hinder attainment of organization goals
- Incompetence (law), the legal status of individuals not of sound mind or mentally impaired, unable to make decisions for themselves
- Military incompetence, failures of members of the military
- Social ineptitude

Incompetence may also refer to:

- Incompetence (geology),
- Incompetence (novel), a comedy novel published in 2003 by Red Dwarf co-creator Rob Grant

== See also ==
- Competence (disambiguation)
- Darwin Awards, a tongue-in-cheek "award" given to people whose incompetence results in their death or loss of ability to reproduce
- Parody, a form of humor that often employs feigned incompetence
- Peter principle, tendency for a person to rise to his or her level of incompetence
- Dunning–Kruger effect, the tendency for incompetent people to grossly overestimate their skills
