= List of The New York Times number-one books of 1969 =

This is a list of books that topped The New York Times best-seller list in 1969.

== Fiction ==
The following list ranks the number-one best-selling fiction books.

Date	Book	Author
January 5	The Salzburg Connection	Helen MacInnes
January 12	The Salzburg Connection	Helen MacInnes
January 19	The Salzburg Connection	Helen MacInnes
January 26	The Salzburg Connection	Helen MacInnes
February 2	The Salzburg Connection	Helen MacInnes
February 9	The Salzburg Connection	Helen MacInnes
February 16	The Salzburg Connection	Helen MacInnes
February 23	The Salzburg Connection	Helen MacInnes
March 2	The Salzburg Connection	Helen MacInnes
March 9	The Salzburg Connection	Helen MacInnes
March 16	Portnoy's Complaint	Philip Roth
March 23	Portnoy's Complaint	Philip Roth
March 30	Portnoy's Complaint	Philip Roth
April 6	Portnoy's Complaint	Philip Roth
April 13	Portnoy's Complaint	Philip Roth
April 20	Portnoy's Complaint	Philip Roth
April 27	Portnoy's Complaint	Philip Roth
May 4	Portnoy's Complaint	Philip Roth
May 11	Portnoy's Complaint	Philip Roth
May 18	Portnoy's Complaint	Philip Roth
May 25	Portnoy's Complaint	Philip Roth
June 1	Portnoy's Complaint	Philip Roth
June 8	Portnoy's Complaint	Philip Roth
June 15	Portnoy's Complaint	Philip Roth
June 22	The Love Machine	Jacqueline Susann
June 29	The Love Machine	Jacqueline Susann
July 6	The Love Machine	Jacqueline Susann
July 13	The Love Machine	Jacqueline Susann
July 20	The Love Machine	Jacqueline Susann
July 27	The Love Machine	Jacqueline Susann
August 3	The Love Machine	Jacqueline Susann
August 10	The Love Machine	Jacqueline Susann
August 17	The Love Machine	Jacqueline Susann
August 24	The Love Machine	Jacqueline Susann
August 31	The Love Machine	Jacqueline Susann
September 7	The Love Machine	Jacqueline Susann
September 14	The Love Machine	Jacqueline Susann
September 21	The Godfather	Mario Puzo
September 28	The Godfather	Mario Puzo
October 5	The Godfather	Mario Puzo
October 12	The Godfather	Mario Puzo
October 19	The Godfather	Mario Puzo
October 26	The Godfather	Mario Puzo
November 2	The Godfather	Mario Puzo
November 9	The Godfather	Mario Puzo
November 16	The Godfather	Mario Puzo
November 23	The Godfather	Mario Puzo
November 30	The Godfather	Mario Puzo
December 7	The Godfather	Mario Puzo
December 14	The Godfather	Mario Puzo
December 21	The Godfather	Mario Puzo
December 28	The Godfather	Mario Puzo

== Nonfiction ==
The following list ranks the number-one best-selling nonfiction books.

Date	Book	Author
January 5	The Money Game	"Adam Smith" (George Goodman)
January 12	The Money Game	"Adam Smith" (George Goodman)
January 19	The Money Game	"Adam Smith" (George Goodman)
January 26	The Money Game	"Adam Smith" (George Goodman)
February 2	The Money Game	"Adam Smith" (George Goodman)
February 9	The Money Game	"Adam Smith" (George Goodman)
February 16	The Money Game	"Adam Smith" (George Goodman)
February 23	The Money Game	"Adam Smith" (George Goodman)
March 2	The Money Game	"Adam Smith" (George Goodman)
March 9	The Money Game	"Adam Smith" (George Goodman)
March 16	The Money Game	"Adam Smith" (George Goodman)
March 23	The Money Game	"Adam Smith" (George Goodman)
March 30	The Money Game	"Adam Smith" (George Goodman)
April 6	The Money Game	"Adam Smith" (George Goodman)
April 13	The Money Game	"Adam Smith" (George Goodman)
April 20	The Money Game	"Adam Smith" (George Goodman)
April 27	The Money Game	"Adam Smith" (George Goodman)
May 4	The 900 Days	Harrison E. Salisbury
May 11	Jennie	Ralph G. Martin
May 18	The 900 Days	Harrison E. Salisbury
May 25	Jennie	Ralph G. Martin
June 1	Jennie	Ralph G. Martin
June 8	Jennie	Ralph G. Martin
June 15	Jennie	Ralph G. Martin
June 22	Jennie	Ralph G. Martin
June 29	Jennie	Ralph G. Martin
July 6	Jennie	Ralph G. Martin
July 13	Jennie	Ralph G. Martin
July 20	The Peter Principle	Laurence J. Peter and Raymond Hull
July 27	The Peter Principle	Laurence J. Peter and Raymond Hull
August 3	The Peter Principle	Laurence J. Peter and Raymond Hull
August 10	The Peter Principle	Laurence J. Peter and Raymond Hull
August 17	The Peter Principle	Laurence J. Peter and Raymond Hull
August 24	The Peter Principle	Laurence J. Peter and Raymond Hull
August 31	The Peter Principle	Laurence J. Peter and Raymond Hull
September 7	The Peter Principle	Laurence J. Peter and Raymond Hull
September 14	The Peter Principle	Laurence J. Peter and Raymond Hull
September 21	The Peter Principle	Laurence J. Peter and Raymond Hull
September 28	The Peter Principle	Laurence J. Peter and Raymond Hull
October 5	The Peter Principle	Laurence J. Peter and Raymond Hull
October 12	The Peter Principle	Laurence J. Peter and Raymond Hull
October 19	The Peter Principle	Laurence J. Peter and Raymond Hull
October 26	The Peter Principle	Laurence J. Peter and Raymond Hull
November 2	The Peter Principle	Laurence J. Peter and Raymond Hull
November 9	The Peter Principle	Laurence J. Peter and Raymond Hull
November 16	The Peter Principle	Laurence J. Peter and Raymond Hull
November 23	The Peter Principle	Laurence J. Peter and Raymond Hull
November 30	The Selling of the President 1968	Joe McGinniss
December 7	The Peter Principle	Laurence J. Peter and Raymond Hull
December 14	The Selling of the President 1968	Joe McGinniss
December 21	The Peter Principle	Laurence J. Peter and Raymond Hull
December 28	The Selling of the President 1968	Joe McGinniss

== See also ==
- Publishers Weekly list of bestselling novels in the United States in the 1960s
