= Competence =

Broad concept article:

- Competence (polyseme), capacity or ability to perform effectively

Competence or competency may also refer to:

- Competence (human resources), ability of a person to do a job properly
  - Competence-based management, performance-oriented organizational operation
  - Core competency, management concept of identifying the basis of competitiveness in an industry
- Competency-based learning, framework for teaching and assessment of learning
- Social competence, social, emotional, cognitive, and behavioral skills needed for successful social adaptation
  - Cultural competence, set of behaviours or social skills
  - Cross-cultural competence, set of congruent behaviors, attitudes, and policies that enables effective work in cross-cultural situations
  - Cultural competence in healthcare, health care services that are sensitive and responsive to the needs of diverse cultures
- Competence (law), ability to understand the nature and effect of the act in which the person is engaged
  - Competency evaluation (law), the means used to determine if a criminal defendant is competent to stand trial
  - EU competences, a model for subsidiarity within the European Union
- Competence (geology), degree of resistance of rocks to deformation in terms of mechanical strength
- Natural competence, ability of cells to alter their own genetics by taking up extracellular DNA
- Communicative competence, broad linguistic internalized knowledge of a language and its usage
- Linguistic competence, system of linguistic knowledge possessed by native speakers of a language
- Conscious competence, a psychological model of learning

== See also ==
- Incompetence (disambiguation)
- Aptitude
- Behavior
- Behaviorism
- Skill
- Competition
