= Putt's Law and the Successful Technocrat =

Book

- Author: Archibald Putt (pseudonym)
- Illustrator: Dennis Driscoll
- Language: English
- Genre: Industrial Management
- Publisher: Wiley-IEEE Press
- Publication date: 28 April 2006
- Publication place: United States
- Media type: Print (hardcover)
- Pages: 171 pages
- ISBN: 0-471-71422-4
- OCLC: 68710099
- Dewey Decimal: 658.22
- LC Class: HD31 .P855 2006

Putt's Law and the Successful Technocrat is a satirical management book credited to the pseudonym Archibald Putt, published in 1981. An updated edition, subtitled How to Win in the Information Age, was published by Wiley-IEEE Press in 2006. The book is based upon a series of articles published in Research/Development Magazine in 1976 and 1977.

It proposes Putt's Law and Putt's Corollary which are principles of negative selection within technical hierarchies, similar to the Dilbert principle proposed by Scott Adams in 1995. Putt's law is sometimes grouped together with the Peter principle, Parkinson's Law and Stephen Potter's Gamesmanship series as "P-literature".

== Publication history ==
The material in the book originated as an 11-part series of articles published in Research/Development Magazine in 1976 and 1977. The first edition was published in 1981 by Exposition Press of Smithtown, New York. A revised second edition was published by Wiley-IEEE Press on April 28, 2006.

The author chose to remain pseudonymous; in an email to Chemical & Engineering News, Putt explained, "I agonized over whether or not to use a pseudonym, but this proved to be a good decision. It gave me the freedom to develop my humor in ways that some might have thought inappropriate for a man in my position."

== Putt's Law and Corollary ==
The book is structured around a central principle and its supporting corollaries. Putt's Law states, "Technology is dominated by two types of people, those who understand what they do not manage and those who manage what they do not understand." Putt's Corollary expands on this, stating, "Every technical hierarchy, in time, develops a competence inversion." The book explains that competence is "flushed out of the lower levels" of a technocratic hierarchy, which ensures that technically competent individuals remain directly in charge of actual technology, while those lacking technical competence move into management roles.

== Key concepts ==
To illustrate how technical hierarchies function, the book introduces several satirical concepts and formulas. One such concept is the "crisis equation," defined as $C = C_0(1 - e^{-t/t_0})$, where C represents the actual crisis level, C₀ is the dismissal level, t is the time since the last promotion, and t₀ is the expected time between promotions. According to the book, an upwardly mobile technocrat precipitates crises to achieve visibility and promotion, while carefully keeping the rate below the dismissal threshold.

Additionally, the book presents a consulting formula, $V_c = P_u \times I_g$, where $V_c$ is the value to the customer, $P_u$ is the price per unit, and $Ig$ is the information given by the consultant. The book also introduces the concept of "creative incompetence," where employees develop incompetence in areas that do not affect their present performance to avoid unwanted promotions. It further outlines laws of advice, stating that "the correct advice given is the advice that is desired" and that "the desired advice is revealed by the structure of the organization, not by the structure of the technology."

== Key characters ==
The book utilizes fictional characters to illustrate its principles within a corporate setting. Dr. I. M. Sharp represents the "successful technocrat" who rises through the hierarchy by creating crises, taking credit for successes, and practicing verbal persuasion; his resume closely resembles the actual author's. In contrast, Roger Proofsworthy is a technically skilled perfectionist who remains at the bottom of the hierarchy despite producing excellent work. Another character, Harvey Goodfellow, represents a consultant who exploits both his technical expert (Ed Vise) and his clients, using discussions to acquire creative ideas without acknowledging their source.

== Reception ==
The book received attention from various technical publications. A review in IEEE Spectrum stated, "This is management writing the way it ought to be. Think Dilbert, but with a very big brain. Read it and weep. Or laugh, depending on your current job situation."

Writing for IEEE Transactions on Professional Communication, Lino Ramirez called it an "outstanding book" that is "entertaining and right on target," praising its "brief, practical, and reader-friendly format." However, an earlier review in the same journal noted that the result of Putt's prose and illustrations was "good satire," though the reviewer was "not convinced" that technical hierarchies require their own unique analysis, as most principles apply to various types of organizations.

== Relationship to other satirical works ==
Putt acknowledged his debt to "the excellent P-literature by Parkinson, Peter, and Potter." The book is often compared to the Dilbert comic strip and the Peter Principle. Ramirez notes that the book begins by introducing the Peter Principle, but argues that technological hierarchies often avoid this trap through "creative incompetence".

== See also ==
- Dilbert principle
- Peter principle
- Parkinson's law
