= Game engagement theory =

Framework of video game engagement

Game Engagement Theory

Details
- Key concepts: Self-Determination Theory; Flow; Immersion; Presence; Intrinsic Motivation

General
- Related fields: Psychology Game Design Human-Computer Interaction
- Applications: Video game development Gamification Health and wellness

Game engagement theory (sometimes called game engagement models or engagement theories in games) refers to theoretical frameworks that explain why and how players become immersed and emotionally invested in games. These theories draw from psychology, motivation, human-computer interaction, and game design to model the processes that create sustained gameplay.

A central influence on many game engagement models is Self-Determination Theory (SDT), which emphasizes the importance of satisfying three psychological needs: autonomy, competence, and relatedness in order to create intrinsic motivation and enjoyment. Other frameworks highlight the role of immersion and presence, flow, or reward and feedback systems in shaping player involvement. Collectively, these perspectives suggests that engagement is achieved when games create a balance between challenge and skill, provide meaningful choices, offer social or narrative connections, and maintain a sense of progress or achievement.

Beyond entertainment, game engagement theories are also applied in areas such as education, gamification, and health and well-being, where engagement is seen as essential for learning, motivation, and adherence. At the same time, game engagement theory hasn’t been centralized and structured, with researchers who have noted potential drawbacks, including the risk of problematic or excessive engagement, which has prompted calls for balanced design that supports player well-being alongside motivation.

== Key concepts and theory ==
=== Motivation Theory ===
Motivation theory highlights the psychological needs of a player and the rewards that drive them to continue to play. Video games are intrinsically rewarding by the very nature of the experience it provides. A widely popular framework in this topic is Self-Determination Theory (SDT), developed by Edward Deci and Richard Ryan. SDT identifies three basic psychological needs: autonomy, competence, and relatedness that relates to intrinsic motivation.

In games, these needs are often addressed through design features. Autonomy is supported when players are given meaningful choices or control over actions. Competence is fostered through challenges, feedback, and opportunities for mastery; and relatedness is promoted through social interaction, multiplayer modes, or narrative relationships.

=== Engagement and immersion ===
Engagement and immersion determines how much a player is involved when playing a game. Immersion refers to the sense of being connected to the game world, where players focus entirely on the activity and briefly lose awareness of their surroundings. Immersion is one of the desired outcomes of effective motivational design in game engagement theory. A game can create a state where players feel fully immersed in the experience by balancing feedback, interactivity, and challenge. This feeling of immersion increases the feeling of enjoyment, persistence, and overall engagement.

=== Game design factor and engagement mechanics ===
Game design is crucial when it comes to creating player engagement. Different mechanics and design functions can encourage players to stay engaged beyond the initial curiosity in the same way that it can also alienate players from ever starting the game at all.

Common engagement factors include challenge, feedback, progression, choice, and player to player interaction. Games maintain engagement by creating clear goals, meaningful rewards (both intrinsic and extrinsic), and feedback systems that respond to player input. Difficulty curves and adaptive challenges maintain player interest by matching the player’s skill level, while visual and audio feedback creates a sense of progress and immersion. Narrative elements, achievements, and cooperative or competitive modes can further create player motivation. Overall, these components together form the foundation of game design and engagement.

== Models of game engagement ==
=== Self Determination Theory Model ===
In game engagement, Self-Determination Theory (SDT) is frequently mentioned as one of the main theories when it comes to player motivation. Rather than using an external reward to motivate players, STD focuses on the importance of intrinsic motivations than is achieved then players’ psychological needs are fulfilled during gameplay.

Self-Determination Theory(SDT) helps developers understand how to create experiences that feel self-driven and meaningful. Player autonomy can be supported by meaningful choice and agency, competence can be supported by balanced challenge and responsive feedback, and relatedness can be supported by social and narrative connections, whether through in-game characters or player to player interactions.

Many studies in game design and player psychology apply SDT to analyze engagement patterns, retention, and player satisfaction.

=== Flow Theory ===
Flow theory, developed by Mihály Csíkszentmihályi, is a theory that describes the mental state in which a person performing some activity is fully immersed in a feeling of energized focus.

In game design, Flow Theory is applied to structural gameplay experiences that maintains player engagement. Designers use flow principle to balance challenge and skill to ensure that a task is both achievable and stimulating. If the effort put in by the player is much greater than the challenge the game provides, the player experiences boredom. If the challenge is much higher than the effort players put in, the game becomes anxious, or even tedious.

This balance encourages continuous play and reduces player frustration. Elements such as adaptive difficulty, clear goals, and immediate feedback are commonly used to support a flow state, sustaining focus, motivation, and enjoyment over time.

=== Immersion and Presence Models ===
Immersion and presence models are used in game development to describe and design the player’s sense of being “inside” the game world, mainly through audiovisual design, narrative structure, and interactivity contributed to engagement. The model draws from research in psychology, media studies, and human-computer interaction with key contributions including the three-level model of immersion, SCI model, and presence theory.

Developers apply these principles by creating consistent visual environments, responsive controls, and believable worlds that encourage players to lose awareness of the physical environment. Immersion and presence are often treated as design outcomes that deepen emotional involvement and support motivational theories such as flow and self-determination theory.

=== Game Engagement Questionnaire ===
The Game Engagement Questionnaire (GEQ) is a psychometric tool developed by Brockmyer et al in 2009 to measure player engagement during gameplay. It uses multiple gauges, including absorption, presence, flow, and immersion to assess engagement. In game development research, the GEQ is used to determine how specific design features influence player involvement and emotional response. The questionnaire is used to link psychological constructs of engagement with measurable gameplay experiences, making it a common tool in usability testing.

=== Player Experience of Need Satisfaction. ===
The Player Experience of Need Satisfaction (PENS) model was developed by Richard M. Ryan, C. Scott Rigby, and Andrew K. Przybylski in 2006. Being an extension of Self-Determination Theory (SDT) adapted towards applications in digital games, PENS measures how well a game satisfies players’ psychological needs for autonomy, competence, and relatedness. It is used to assess how design elements such as player choice, challenge, feedback, and social features contribute to intrinsic motivation and enjoyment. PENS is often employed alongside other engagement metrics to evaluate motivational quality and to inform design strategies that promote sustained engagement.
