= Raymond Hull =

Raymond Hull may refer to:

- Raymond Hull (writer)
- Raymond Hull (politician)
