= Skills management =

Developing the skills employees need

Skills management is the practice of understanding, developing and deploying people and their skills. Well-implemented skills management should identify the skills that job roles require, the skills of individual employees, and any gap between the two.

== Overview ==
The skills involved can be defined by the organization or by third party institutions. They are usually defined in terms of a skills framework, also known as a competency framework or skills matrix. This consists of a list of skills, and a grading system, with a definition of what it means to be at particular level for a given skill. In some cases, organizations can also use mutual feedback and assessments to crowdsource the calculation of skills. Organizations use skills matrices to make informed decisions about hiring, team composition, succession planning, and employee development.

To perform management functions and assume multiple roles, managers must be skilled. Robert Katz identified three managerial skills essential to successful management: technical, human, and conceptual.

== History ==
In 2003, the HR team at IBM saw the need to develop a set of tools and processes for managing their large workforce. IBM could see that data insights would become ever more vital to business success and they concluded that a system that tracks and provides ample information about their most important asset (their people) was needed for continued performance. As a result, they developed the Workforce Management Initiative.

IBM recorded tremendous success from this initiative. Although the system cost millions of dollars to implement, IBM quickly saw the financial benefits of the system. They stated that the system "paid for itself just in the hard savings from better contractor management, not counting the improvement in full-time employee management."

Over time, many other companies saw the value of tracking employee skills. Some initially tried to do this with ratings on paper documents, but this was largely unsuccessful since they ended up with a large amount of paper documents that cannot be queried. Others used spreadsheets which performed much better than paper reviews. Spreadsheets are still being used to track skills in our time. These spreadsheets are called skill matrices.

As a result of skills management, employees would be aware of the skills their job requires, and any skills gaps that they have. Depending on their employer, it may also result in a personal development plan (PDP) of training to bridge some or all of those skills gaps over a given period. Employees gain from improved identification and understanding of their own strengths and weaknesses, from being able to set personal goals, and to understand the value they bring to the organization (which in turn can boost morale)

== See also ==
- Knowledge management
- Competence (disambiguation)
