= Dilbert principle =

Satirical observation by Scott Adams

The Dilbert principle is a satirical concept of management developed by Scott Adams, creator of the comic strip Dilbert, which states that companies tend to promote incompetent employees to management to minimize their ability to harm productivity. The Dilbert principle is inspired by the Peter principle, which is that employees are promoted based on success until they attain their "level of incompetence" and are no longer successful. Adams first explained the principle in a 1995 Wall Street Journal article, and he elaborated upon it in his humorous 1996 book The Dilbert Principle.

== Definition ==
In the Dilbert comic strip of February 5, 1995, Dogbert says that "leadership is nature's way of removing morons from the productive flow". Adams himself explained,

I wrote The Dilbert Principle around the concept that in many cases the least competent, least smart people are promoted, simply because they’re the ones you don't want doing actual work. You want them ordering the doughnuts and yelling at people for not doing their assignments—you know, the easy work. Your heart surgeons and your computer programmers—your smart people—aren't in management. That principle was literally happening everywhere.

Adams explained the principle in a 1995 Wall Street Journal article. Adams then elaborated his study of the Dilbert principle in his 1996 book The Dilbert Principle, which is required or recommended reading at some management and business programs. In the book, Adams writes that, in terms of effectiveness, use of the Dilbert principle is akin to a band of gorillas choosing an alpha-squirrel to manage them by an incredibly convoluted process. The book has sold more than a million copies and was on the New York Times bestseller list for 43 weeks.

== Comparative principles ==
The Dilbert principle can be compared to the Peter principle. As opposed to the Dilbert principle, the Peter principle assumes that people are promoted because they are competent, but the tasks higher in the hierarchy require skills or talents they do not possess. It concludes that, due to this, a competent employee will eventually be promoted to, and then likely remain at, a job at which he or she is incompetent. In his book, The Peter Principle, Laurence J. Peter explains "percussive sublimation", the act of "kicking a person upstairs" (i.e., promoting him to management) to reduce his interference with productive employees.

The Dilbert principle, by contrast, assumes that hierarchy just serves as a means for removing the incompetent to "higher" positions where they will be unable to cause damage to the workflow, assuming that the upper echelons of an organization have little relevance to its actual production, and that the majority of real, productive work in a company is done by people who rank lower. Unlike the Peter principle, the promoted individuals were not particularly good at any job they previously had, so awarding them a supervisory position is a way to remove them from the workforce without actually dismissing them, rather than a reward for meritorious service. An earlier formulation of this effect was known as Putt's Law (1981), credited to the pseudonymous author Archibald Putt ("Technology is dominated by two types of people, those who understand what they do not manage and those who manage what they do not understand.").

== See also ==
- Negative selection (politics) – Aversion to the success of one's subordinates
