= Incompetence =

Inability to successfully perform expected tasks or duties

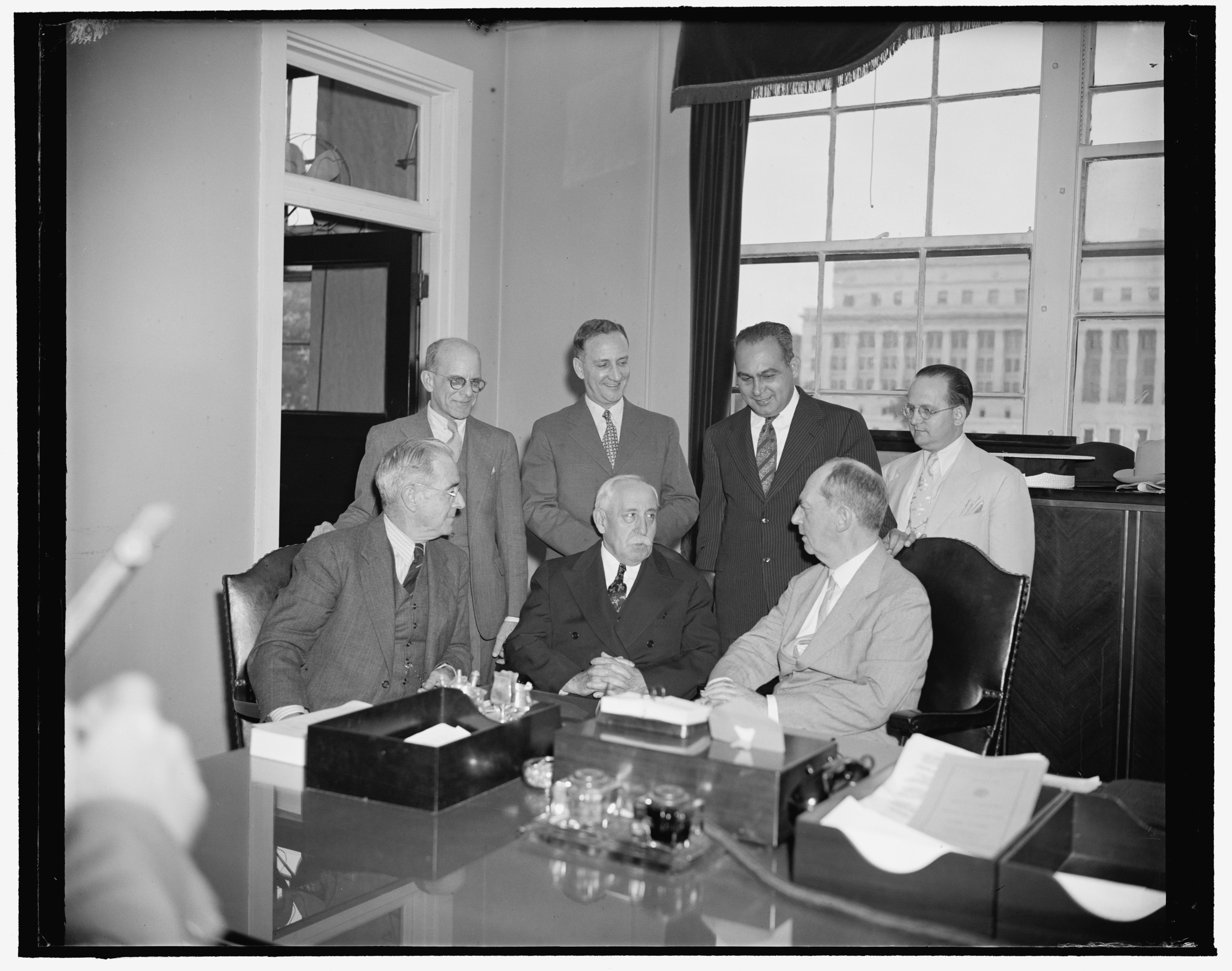
A management that is rigid and distant from its employees can cause inefficiencies that lead to incompetence

Incompetence is the inability to perform expected tasks or duties. More generally, it is a term that indicates the ineffectiveness of a subject or system in relation to its universe. It can have several meanings: social, economic, systemic and even in nature. It is the opposite of competence which is being skilled or capable of something, or the opposite of the concept of competitiveness.

The Peter principle is a controversial and oversimplified concept that postulates that talented employees are promoted until they are given a managerial job they are not good at and thus "reach their level of incompetence".

Incompetence can be both conscious and unconscious, that is, whether one is aware of one's own incompetence or not. It has been argued that unconscious incompetence can flourish more easily in workplaces where everyone has the same education.

Incompetence is sometimes seen alongside overconfidence, known as the Dunning-Kruger effect, which claims that incompetent people often grossly overestimate their abilities.

== Examples ==
Social incompetence indicates a physical person or system that does not have the capacity or necessary skills to solve problems or function effectively.

Administrative incompetence is when dysfunctional administrative behavior hinders the achievement of the organization's goals.

Economic incompetence can refer to a company or economic system that is unable to maintain itself effectively in the market.

Judicial incompetence can, for example, be when a court declares itself incompetent when the case it is handling is outside its scope.

In the wild nature, an aging predator becomes incompetent at finding its natural prey, which can cause them to choose prey that was previously outside its food range. This is common in tigers in India and lions in Africa.

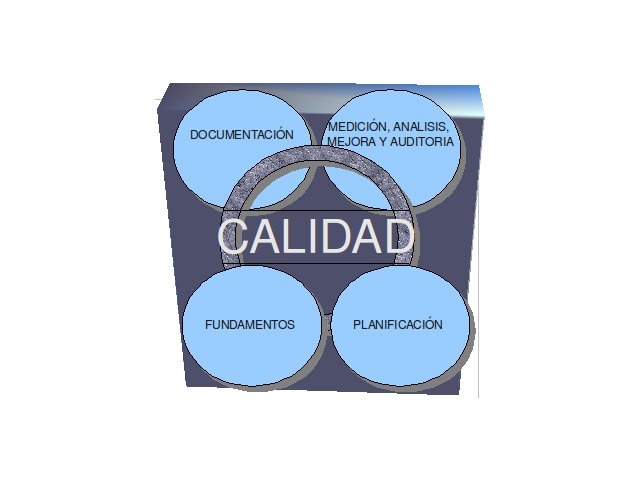
Implementing a quality system can be an effective tool against incompetence

== Theories of incompetence ==
The following generic examples are intended to explain the causes of incompetence.

In terms of employment, a person becomes incompetent in their position when one of these situations occur:

- Lack of personal motivation and lack of leadership from superiors
- Promotions to positions for which one is not qualified for
- Loss of the objectives and key results of one's position
- Acquisition of bad work habits
- Conformism and passivity in the face of change
- Dilution of the authority of the different levels of the system
- Despair over ambiguous policies
- Inability to work in a team, inability to socialize

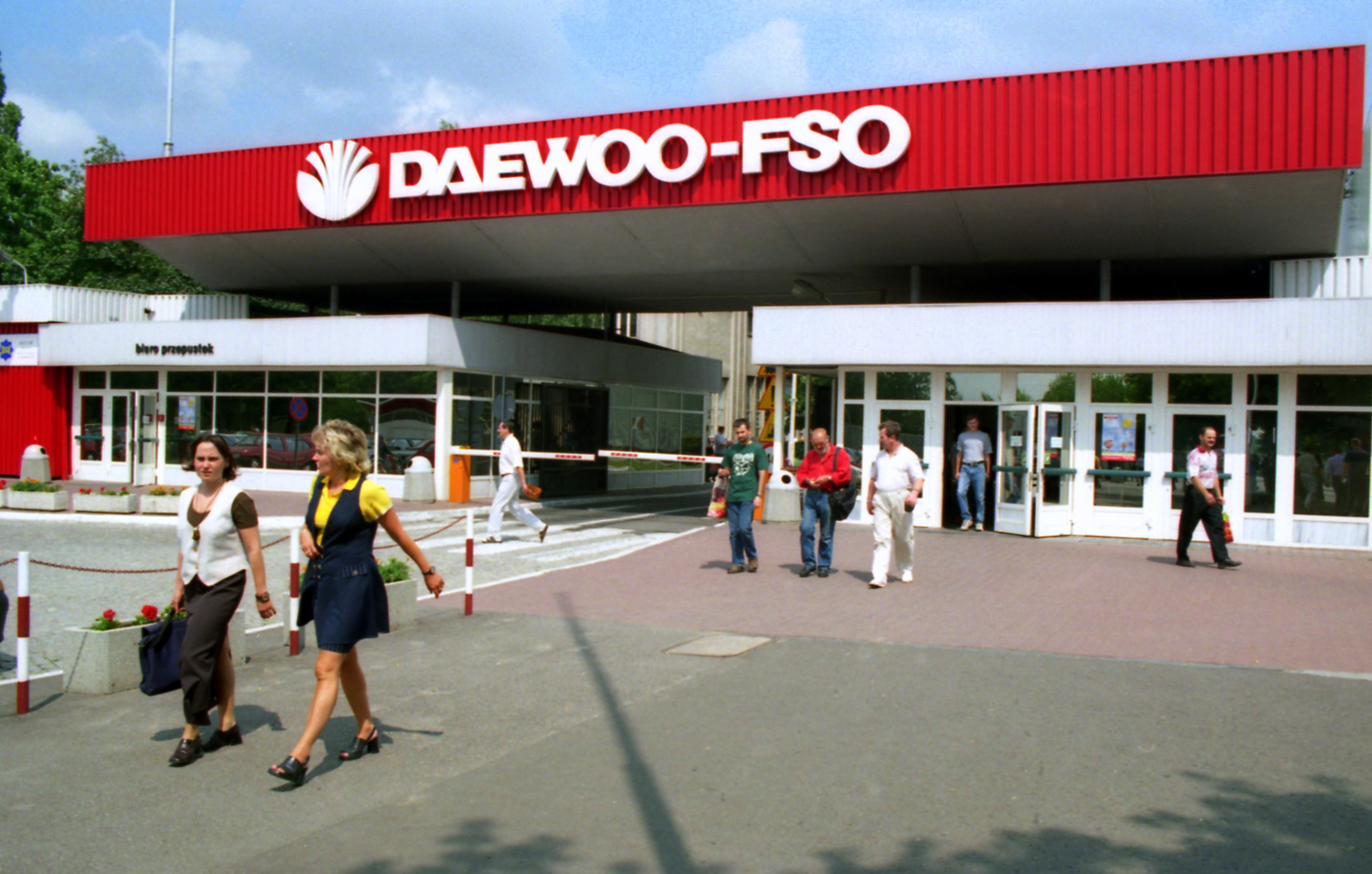
Large companies are not exempt from being affected by incompetence at a certain level. Daewoo was a symbolic example of incompetence in light of its debt levels.

In economic terms, a company may become incompetent in the market when any of these examples occur:

- Inability to understand changes and trends in the market
- Inability to adapt to market demands
- Inability to maintain the balance between supply and demand
- Lack of modernization and incorporation of new technological tools
- Lack of adequate marketing
- Excessive bureaucracy
- Rigid management and mediocre middle management
- Non-existent, poorly implemented or weak quality management systems
- Poor business practices
- Poor productivity rates
- Objectives or policies not being transferred to lower levels of authority
- Inability to negotiate and conquer niches with demand

== See also ==
- Darwin Awards, an ironic "prize" given to individuals whose incompetence results in their death or loss of the ability to reproduce
- Insanity defense, a term for whether a person is criminally responsible for something they have done
- Parody, a form of humor that often makes fun of incompetence
