= Competence (polyseme) =

Ability or capacity to perform a task effectively or successfully

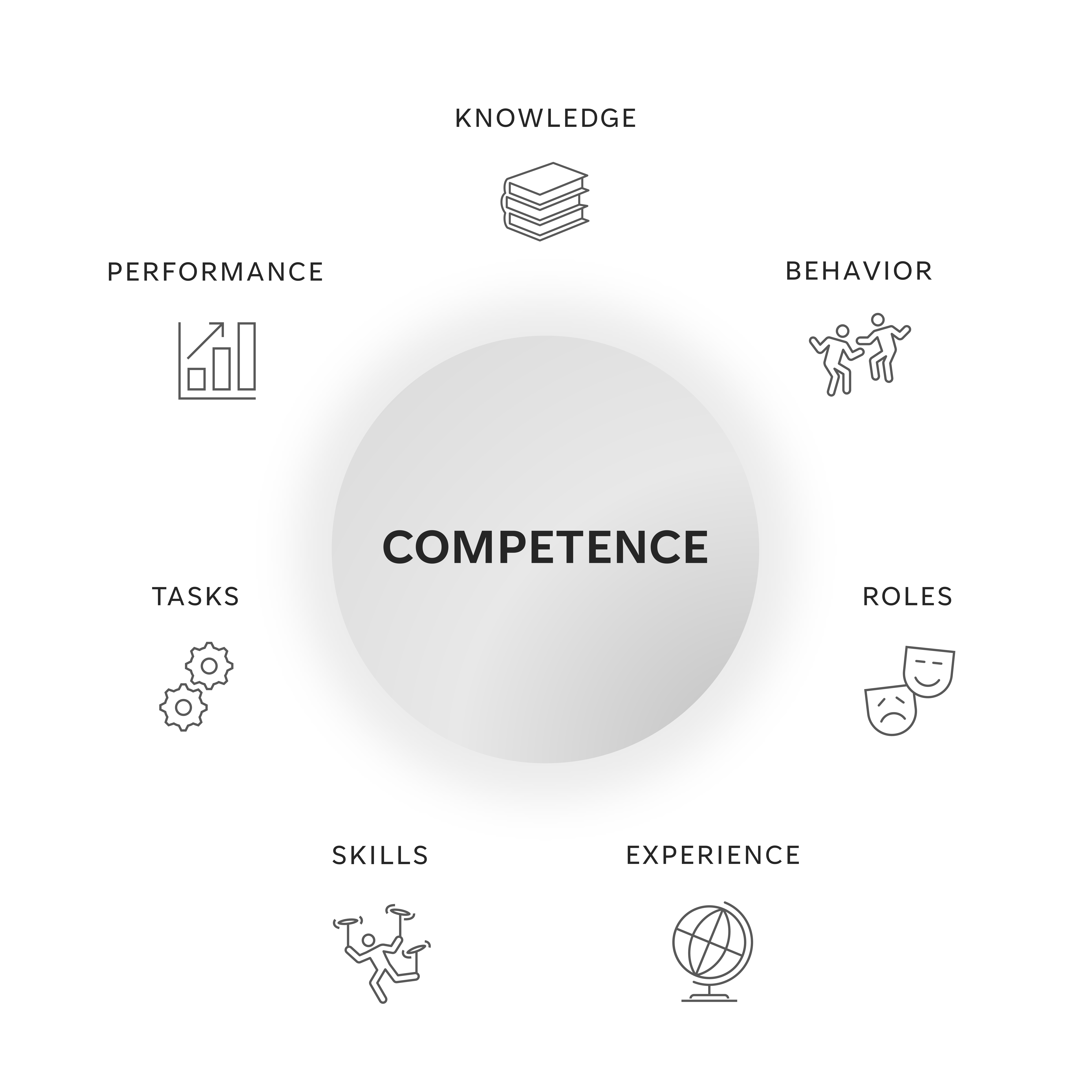
Generic competence model with corresponding attributes

Competence (also called competency or capability) is a polyseme indicating a variety of different notions. In current literature, three notions are most evident. The first notion is that of a general competence, which is someone's capacity or ability to perform effectively on a specified set of behavioral attributes (e.g. performances, skills, attitudes, tasks, roles, talents, and so forth). The second notion refers to someone's capacity or ability to successfully perform a specific behavioral attribute — be it overt or covert — like learning a language, reading a book or playing a musical instrument. In both notions, someone may be qualified as being competent. In a third notion, a competence is the behavioral attribute itself, instead of a general or specific capacity or ability. One may for example excel at the competence of baking, at the competency of ceramics, or at the capability of reflexivity.

The pluralized forms of competence and competency are respectively competences and competencies. According to Boyatzis (2008) competencies are part of a behavioral approach to emotional, social, and cognitive intelligence. Moreover, competence is measurable and can be developed through training. In the context of human resources, practice may enable someone to improve the efficiency or performance of an activity or a job.

Concepts like knowledge, expertise, values or desires are not behavioral attributes but can be contained in behavior once executed. Take for example sharing knowledge or actualizing a desire.

== Etymology ==
The term 'competence' is not novel, and it predates literature in the 20th century. It first entered professional literature via the article Motivation reconsidered: The concept of competence authored by R.W. White in 1959. He introduced the term competence to describe those personality characteristics associated with high motivation and superior performance. Postulating a relationship between achieved capacity and competence motivation, White defined competence as an ‘effective interaction (of the individual) with the environment’.

In the late 1960s, the 'Competence movement' had been initiated by David McClelland. The movement has its origins in the conspicuous failure of educational qualifications to predict occupational success. The term gained traction in 1973, when McClelland wrote a seminal paper entitled Testing for Competence Rather Than for Intelligence. McClelland followed White's approach in arguing that capacity is more important than intelligence.

The term has since been popularized, most notably, by individuals such as:

- Thomas F. Gilbert, in Human competence: engineering worthy performance (1978);
- Richard E. Boyatzis, in The Competent Manager: A Model for Effective Performance (1982);
- C. K. Prahalad and Gary Hamel, in The Core Competence of the Corporation (1990) and
- Daniel Goleman, in Emotional Intelligence: Why It Can Matter More Than IQ (1995).

Its uses vary widely, which has led to considerable misunderstanding. Studies on competence indicate that competence covers a very complicated and extensive range of disciplines, ranging from human resources to psychology and from science to education, with various scholars holding different interpretations of the term. According to Zemke (1982), the terms 'competency', 'competence', and their affiliated counterparts are akin to "Humpty Dumpty words" that derive their meaning solely from the interpreter's intent. This issue arises not due to ill intentions, ignorance, or commercial motives, but stems from procedural and philosophical variations among those vying to establish and shape the concept. This involves constructing the blueprint for how the broader population will incorporate competencies into their routine training endeavors.

=== Competence and capability ===
In an influential paper from 1992, Dorothy A. Leonard took on a knowledge-based approach when discussing competency in the context of managerial and technical systems. She defined a 'core capability' as a set of knowledge that distinguishes a company strategically. Core capability wasn't new concept, back in the '90s. Other scholars have also referred to it using various terms like distinctive competences, core competencies, resource deployments, and invisible assets. Leonard was however the first to explicitly plot core capabilities against core rigidities. In a narrow sense, core rigidities represent inappropriate knowledge-sets that can hinder a firm's progress. Following the release of this paper, a tendency has grown to employ the terms competencies and capabilities interchangeably, often without clear differentiation. In other instances, a more precise definition is given priority over a highly inclusive scope.

=== Competence and performance ===
Performance has been described by some scholars as the capacity or ability to accomplish specific tasks. Noteworthy figures such as White, McClelland, and Boyatzis have all upheld the notion that competence is tantamount to effective performance. Furthermore, a consensus has arisen among scholars like McClelland, Boyatzis, Spencer and Spencer, as well as H.F. Evarts, regarding the similarity between competence and superior performance. Authors including McClelland, Kanungo and Misra, and Martin and Staines consider competence to be successful performance. All these conceptualizations corroborate performance's role as a neutral carrier for competence. Oftentimes, the term "performance" is extended to delineate the capacity or ability of mechanical, rather than biological systems, to fulfill certain tasks. This task-oriented approach diverges from a behavioral approach as to evade anthropomorphisms. Amidst ongoing developments in artificial intelligence, mechanistic systems receive anthropomorphic characteristics increasingly often. The way performance is being defined mirrors attempts made by authors to emphasize core competence in a similar light. This attempt has failed however, since a consensus on consistent use of competence and competency as separate terms has not been established.

=== Competence and intelligence ===
In his influential paper 'Testing for Competence Rather Than for Intelligence' David McClelland sheds light on the advantages of measuring competence over intelligence. McClelland points out that the traits measured by traditional intelligence tests do not reliably correlate with high-level performance in society. He goes on to identify a significant error in categorizing these abilities as "general intelligence", advocating for a more nuanced approach. McClelland's approach acknowledges the multifaceted nature of human capabilities, signaling a departure from a singular focus on cognitive or intellectual abilities.

McClelland emphasizes that there is no solid evidence to suggest that human traits, including cognitive abilities, are innate and cannot be altered. This perspective aligns with the idea that individuals have the capacity to grow, learn, and develop new skills throughout their lives. McClelland's perspective encourages a move away from the pursuit of pinpointing abstract ability factors. Instead, he urges the adoption of assessments that align with the evolving nature of human potential. He suggests that tests rooted in life-outcome behaviors can validate their worth by demonstrating that a person's ability to perform such tasks improves as their competence in those areas increases.

== Competence typologies ==
=== Atomistic and holistic competence ===
In 1996, a paper titled "What is competence?" was published by Hager and Gonczi, which addresses an apparent tension between atomistic and holistic competence. Hager and Gonczi criticize the misconception among scholars that labeling an approach as atomistic automatically warrants its rejection without further justification. They emphasize the necessity of justifying the application of any competence standard. To illustrate their point, they draw an analogy with chemistry, where discrete atoms come together to form molecules with distinct properties. Similarly, in the interpretation of competence, especially occupational competence, the authors assert that breaking down an occupation into isolated tasks, as done in a task-oriented approach, is inherently atomistic. This approach fails to provide a synthesis of the tasks, thereby undermining the complex nature of the occupation and corresponding competences. On the other hand, Hager and Gonczi caution against adhering strictly to a rigid holism that dismisses all forms of analysis. They acknowledge that some degree of atomism in competence approaches may be necessary, as long as it is complemented by an appropriate amount of holism. Finding the right balance between analysis and synthesis is crucial for understanding and developing competency standards effectively.

Occupational competences are constructs, which are often inferred from the performance of complex tasks. In contrast, the performance of a task is directly observable and doesn't have to be inferred. Unlike atomistic tasks, holistic tasks are not discrete and independent. For example, practice and assessment, will typically involve a simultaneity of several tasks. Furthermore, these tasks will involve ‘situational understanding’, which means that a worker must take into account multiple contexts while being involved in practice. Although tasks are given as an example, Hager and Gonczi stress the importance of integrating competence standards as to also include attributes. Forgetting about attributes and concentrating solely on tasks may lead someone to lapse into a narrow view of occupational competence, they insist. Approaches to competence that focus exclusively on either tasks or attributes ignore the complex nature of competence. Hence an integrated approach to competence standards, which integrates key tasks and attributes, is supported.

=== Behavioral and functional competence ===
The competence movement has inspired individuals from a variety of countries like the United States, the United Kingdom, France, Germany and Australia. Two traditions in particular have represented the early stages of the competence movement, namely the behavioral (or US) approach and the functional (or UK) approach. Multiple scholars have attempted to differentiate between these two traditions. Delamare Le Deist and Winterton (2005) are convinced that since the 1990's the behavioral conception of competence had been transformed into a broader functional conception, which includes knowledge and skills alongside behavioral characteristics. Terry Hyland (1997) offers an alternative interpretation. According to Hyland, alternative models only purport to include wide-ranging knowledge and values. He supposes that functional analysis, which would be inherent to behavioral approaches, is primarily committed to the assessment and accreditation of performance outcomes, not performance improvement. Those who wish to apply their models to value-laden occupations, such as teaching, run into the problem that competence systems, whether these are atomistic as in the British model or allegedly holistic as in the Australian model, are concerned only with performance outcomes, not with the processes of learning and development. Chivers and Cheetham (2000) supplement that not only does the functional approach favor outcomes over processes, it heavily emphasizes occupational standards over vocational standards. Furthermore, Hyland clarifies that functional analysis can only wish to supplement or temper a behaviorist approach. Hyland hereby firmly presents the key difference between the behavioral and functional approach. Even within the predominantly behavioral approach, many conceptions of competence now include knowledge and skills alongside attitudes, behaviors, work habits, abilities and personal characteristics. The behavioral approach is promoted most notably by David McClelland, Boyatzis, and Spencer and Spencer.

=== Professional competence ===
Since the 1950s, the concept of competence has found its way into professional literature, transforming various fields and shaping the way we understand professional capabilities. Over the decades, competence models have played a significant role in mapping professions and crafting effective professional education and development programs. At its core, Mulder (2014) suggests, competence development is a socio-constructivist journey. It thrives on the dynamic interplay of social interactions, wherein professionals engage in context-specific quests to improve their capacity.

There have been numerous competence frameworks supporting competence development. One such initiative is competence-based teacher education (CBTE), which came about during the 1970s. Rooted in behavioristic psychology and educational philosophy, CBTE sought to prepare students for specific functions. However, the undertaken was not devoid of challenges and critiques. In response to the limitations of function-oriented perspectives, the concept of integrated occupationalism emerged. Unlike a narrow focus on job profiles, this approach embraced a broader vision. It emphasized holistic, generic and integrated capabilities that are vital for navigating the complexities of occupational roles. On top of integrated occupationalism, situated professionalism emerged. This theory established a nexus between competence and the context in which professionals interact. At the core lies the cultivation of a professional identity, reflecting the principles of situated cognition. It delves into the idea that competence is shaped by the expectations of stakeholders, guiding the professional towards desired actions and outcomes. The culmination of these endeavors has resulted in the enrichment of professional and practice-based learning across many fields.

=== Personal competence ===
In his study, Day (1994) points out that beginning in the 1980s, there has been a growing acknowledgment within both business and education sectors regarding the development of personal profiles and portfolios. As a result, employees are now significantly more involved in identifying their individual learning needs. This has led to the recognition and acceptance of personal development as an integral aspect of professional growth. Furthermore, Day's study indicates that personal competences can be examined separately from one's professional competence, though it might be useful to consider both.

Scholars frequently examine interpersonal and intrapersonal competences. For instance, Park et al. (2017) conducted a study on a tripartite taxonomy of character, investigating interpersonal, intrapersonal, and intellectual competences in children. Park et al. has built upon the competency clusters introduced by the National Research Council (NRC). The tripartite taxonomy was however already apparent since B. B. Rothenberg released her study 'Children's social sensitivity and the relationship to interpersonal competence, intrapersonal comfort, and intellectual level' in 1970.

Park et al. has gathered evidence supporting the usefulness of a tripartite taxonomy of character within the school context. The study defines its taxonomy as follows: interpersonal character includes gratitude, social intelligence, and self-control, while intrapersonal character involves academic performance and perseverance. Lastly, intellectual character includes curiosity and enthusiasm. Based on this research orientation, Park et al. found that interpersonal competence predicts positive peer relations, intrapersonal competence predicts grades and regulated behavior, and intellectual competence predicts class participation and active learning.

=== Core competence ===
Core competence can be interpreted as the competence of an organization, but may also pertain to a group of individuals operating within an organization. Core competences encompass the amassed capabilities within an organization, in particular attempts to harmonize professional skills and technological innovation. At its essence, core competence includes involvement, commitment and communication, transcending organizational boundaries and hierarchies, while fostering a culture of inclusivity within the organization.

At the nexus between 'core competences' and 'end products' are the core products. Core products are the physical components (e.g. subassemblies) that increase the value of the end products. Well-targeted core products allow a company to optimize its development stage and go-to-market strategy. By increasing the number of application arenas for its core products, a company can systematically improve efficiency, and reduce expenses and risks associated with novel product creation. In essence, well-targeted core products have the potential to yield economies of both scale and scope.

=== Metacompetence ===
According to Brown (1993), metacompetences refer to advanced capabilities associated with learning, creating, adapting and anticipating, rather than merely showcasing a capability to perform on a specific task. This is particularly evident in learning and reflecting, which are crucial for developing mental frameworks. Metacompetences often encompass the concept of 'learning to learn'. Metacompetence can also be summarized as the capability to improve one's competences.

=== Other typologies ===
Various other typologies exist to categorize competence in a wider context. These include:

- Social competence: the ability to navigate social interactions effectively.
- Cultural competence: the ability to meet cultural expectations.
- Cross-cultural competence: the ability to adapt effectively in cross-cultural environments.
- Communicative competence: the ability to communicate adequately, both verbally and nonverbally.
- Linguistic competence: the mastery of a specific language, including grammar, vocabulary, and pronunciation.

This list is not exhaustive. Competence typologies cover a wide range, with new typologies emerging regularly to address specific contexts.

== Disciplines ==
=== Education ===
Growing demand for knowledge acquisition across various professional and personal spheres has raised the importance of effective education. Beginning in the late 1980s, governmental intervention worldwide has led to a considerable reconsideration of competence outcomes at all levels of the educational spectrum, encompassing elementary, secondary, tertiary, vocational, empirical and adult education. The value and valuation of these outcomes serve as criteria for assessing the productivity and quality of the educational system. According to Klieme et al. (2008), effective education could no longer be supported by a rigid canon of intergenerational knowledge and professional qualifications. A more dynamic approach is needed to meet the everchanging competence requirements.

=== Academia ===
Academic competence, seen as a subset of student competence, hinges on the effective application of study skills. According to a study conducted by Gettinger and Seiberts (2002), students across all grade levels who possess strong study skills tend to excel academically. However, they suggest, for study skills to be truly effective in promoting academic competence, students must exhibit enough willingness and motivation to engage in studying. Student engagement and proper utilization of study skills are closely intertwined, both bolstering academic competence. Unfortunately, many students pass through the educational system without attaining the level of academic competence necessary for academic success. In light of this, Gettinger and Seiberts emphasize prioritizing research aimed at implementing effective classroom strategies and promoting effective study habits among all students.

=== Human resources ===
Leading up to the 1990s, the application of 'capability' as a behavioral approach (competence) had primarily centered around innovation and learning experiences aimed at fostering capability in both educational and workplace settings, as noted by Stephenson & Weil (1992) and Graves (1993). During the 1990s, in particular in Australia, people grew hesitant of the behavioral approach. The association between capability and human resources strengthened, shifting away the attention from education. Hase & Davis (1999) explains this transgression as follows: while competencies form the foundation of capability, competencies alone may be insufficient for achieving optimal human resource management. They proclaim that competencies are rooted in a traditional 'pedagogical paradigm', which fails to fully equip individuals with the attributes needed to succeed in a workplace setting.

=== Miscellaneous ===
Other relevant disciplines, wherein competence plays a role, are among others science, pedagogy, professional psychology, healthcare, and engineering.

== See also ==
- Circle of competence – Subject area matching a person's skills or expertise
- Competency architecture – Framework of skills used in competency-based learning
- Competency dictionary – Competency within an organization
- Dunning–Kruger effect – Cognitive bias about one's own skill
- Peter principle – Management concept by Laurence J. Peter
