= John Gall (author) =

American author and pediatrician

John Gall (September 18, 1925 – December 15, 2014) was an American author, scholar, and pediatrician. Gall is known for his 1975 book General systemantics: an essay on how systems work, and especially how they fail..., a critique of systems theory. One of the statements from this book has become known as Gall's law.

== Biography ==
Gall started his studies in St. John's College in Annapolis, Maryland. He received further medical training at George Washington University Medical School in Washington, and Yale College. Eventually, in the early 1960s he took his pediatric training at the Mayo Clinic in Rochester, Minnesota.

In the 1960s Gall started as a practicing pediatrician in Ann Arbor, Michigan, and became part of the faculty of the University of Michigan. In 2001 he retired after more than 40 years of private practice. In the first decades of his practice he had also "conducted weekly seminars in Parenting Strategies for parents, prospective parents, medical students, nursing students, and other health care practitioners." Until 2001 he held the position of clinical associate professor of pediatrics at the University of Michigan. Beginning in 1958 he was a Fellow of the American Academy of Pediatrics.

After he retired, Gall and his wife Carol A. Gall moved to Walker, Minnesota, where he continued writing and published seven more titles. He died on December 15, 2014, from natural causes.

== Work ==
Gall's main research interest was the behavioral and developmental problems of children, on which subject he published several scientific papers and books. As a sideline he conducted more general research on the question of what makes systems work and fail. He collected and analyzed all kinds of examples of systems-failures, and generalized problems and pitfalls into a series of "Laws of Systems".

In 2002 Gall also published a historical novel on Hatshepsut, queen of ancient Egypt in the Eighteenth Dynasty. This interest arose from a trip he made to Egypt in 1969.

=== Systemantics ===
In 1975 he published his systems research under the title General systemantics, republished two years later as Systemantics: How Systems Work and Especially How They Fail by Quadrangle, The New York Times Book Company. This work has been translated into Spanish, German, Hebrew, and Japanese.

In 1986 the second edition was published with the title Systemantics: The Underground Text of Systems Lore., which was almost twice the size of the first edition.

In 2002 he published a third edition under the title The Systems Bible. This work inspired many authors in the systems movement, such as scientists Mario Bunge (1979), Paul Watzlawick (1990) and Russell L. Ackoff (1999), and systems designers Ken Orr (1981) and Grady Booch (1991).

=== Gall's law ===
Gall's law is a rule of thumb for systems design from Gall's book Systemantics: How Systems Work and Especially How They Fail. It states:

A complex system that works is invariably found to have evolved from a simple system that worked. A complex system designed from scratch never works and cannot be patched up to make it work. You have to start over with a working simple system.

This law is essentially an argument in favour of underspecification: it can be used to explain the success of systems like the World Wide Web and Blogosphere, which grew from simple to complex systems incrementally, and the failure of systems like CORBA, which began with complex specifications. Gall's Law has strong affinities to the practice of agile software development. Following the rise of AI coding agents, the law has been invoked as a caution against using such tools to rapidly build over-architected systems, on the grounds that complex systems assembled quickly are still prone to the failures Gall described.

Although dubbed Gall's Law by some, the phrase is not labeled as such in the original work. The work cites Murphy's Law and the Peter Principle, and includes similar sayings.

Although the quote may seem to validate the merits of simple systems, it is preceded by the qualifier, "A simple system may or may not work." (p. 70). This philosophy can also be attributed to extreme programming, which encourages doing the simplest thing first and adding features later.

One of the first systems designers to quote Gall's law was Ken Orr in 1981. Notable were the quotations of Gall's Law by Grady Booch since 1991, which were mentioned in multiple sources.

== Selected books ==
- 1975. General systemantics : an essay on how systems work, and especially how they fail, together with the very first annotated compendium of basic systems axioms : a handbook and ready reference for scientists, engineers, laboratory workers, administrators, public officials, systems analysts, etc., etc., etc., and the general public.. General Systemantics Press, Ann Arbor, Michigan.
- 1986. Systemantics: The Underground Text of Systems Lore. How Systems Really Work and How They Fail (2nd edition). ISBN 0-9618251-0-3.
- 1993. Elegant parenting: (how to do it right the first time. with Beth Gall.
- 2002. The Systems Bible: The Beginner's Guide to Systems Large and Small (3rd edition of Systemantics). ISBN 0-9618251-7-0.
- 2002. First Queen: A Historical Novel on the Life of Hatshepsut Queen of Egypt
- 2004. Dancing With Elves: Parenting As a Performing Art
- 2008. Hit by a Low Flying Goose. with Carol A. Gall
