= Negative selection =

Negative selection may refer to:

== In biology ==
- Negative selection (natural selection), the selective removal of rare alleles that are deleterious
- Negative selection (artificial selection), when negative, rather than positive, traits of a species are selected for

== In immunology ==
- Negative selection (immunology), in which B-cells and T-cells that recognize MHC molecules bound to peptides of self-origin, or just MHC molecules with high affinity are deleted from the repertoire of immune cells

== In politics ==
- Negative selection (politics), a process that occurs in rigid hierarchies, most notably dictatorships
