= Circle of competence =

Subject area matching a person's skills or expertise

Euler diagram showing the actual circle of competence compared to the perceived circle, for an individual who overestimates their level of competence

A circle of competence is the subject area which matches a person's skills or expertise. The concept was developed by Warren Buffett and Charlie Munger as what they call a mental model, a codified form of business acumen, concerning the investment strategy of limiting one's financial investments in areas where an individual may have limited understanding or experience, while concentrating in areas where one has the greatest familiarity. The strategy emphasizes the importance of aligning one's subjective assessment with actual competence. Buffett summarized the concept in the motto, "Know your circle of competence, and stick within it. The size of that circle is not very important; knowing its boundaries, however, is vital."

In his 1996 letter to Berkshire Hathaway, Buffett further expanded:

What an investor needs is the ability to correctly evaluate selected businesses. Note that word 'selected': You don't have to be an expert on every company, or even many. You only have to be able to evaluate companies within your circle of competence.

Sampan Nettayanun from Naresuan University traces the concept, if not the terminology, as far back as Andrew Carnegie, in his decision to concentrate on iron and steel, writing "My advice to young men would be not only to concentrate their whole time and attention on the one business in life in which they engage, but to put every dollar of their capital into it."

Operating within one's circle of competence may be compared with those who act over-confidently. For example, institutional investors who have been successful in the past are more likely to attribute their success to their own abilities, rather than external forces, and are therefore more likely to make investments in areas outside their circle of competence. The strategy of operating within their individual circles has been cited as the reason both Buffett and Munger avoided investing in the technology sector.

The breadth of any individual's circle of competence may be determined by a range of factors, including their profession, spending habits, and the types of products they normally use. Remaining within one's circle confers a number of benefits, such as an unfair information advantage, the narrowing of available options, and the reduction of poor decision making.

== See also ==
- Competence (human resources) – Ability of a person to do a job properly
- Dunning–Kruger effect – Cognitive bias about one's own skill
- Peter principle – Management concept by Laurence J. Peter
