= Competence (human resources) =

Ability of a person to do a job properly

Competence is the set of demonstrable personal characteristics at a high level with consistency and minimal difficulty. Competency in human resources is a series of knowledge, abilities, skills, experiences and behaviors, which leads to effective performance in an individual's activities. Competency is measurable and can be developed through training. It can also be broken down into smaller criteria. Some scholars see "competence" as an aspect that can be developed through training because it is a combination of practical & theoretical knowledge which involves cognitive skills, behavior, and values used to improve performance. Competency is the state or quality of being adequately or well qualified, possessing the ability to perform a specific, measurable job. For instance, competency needed for management, depending on the sector, might include system thinking and emotional intelligence, as well as skills in influence and negotiation.

== Etymology ==
The term "competence" first appeared in an article authored by R.W. White in 1959 as a concept for performance motivation. In 1970, Craig C. Lundberg defined this concept as "Planning the Executive Development Program". The term gained traction in 1973 when David McClelland wrote a seminal paper entitled, "Testing for Competence Rather Than for Intelligence". The term, created by McClelland, was commissioned by the State Department to explain characteristics common to high-performing agents of embassy, as well as help them in recruitment and development. It has since been popularized by Richard Boyatzis, and many others including T.F. Gilbert (1978), who used the concept in performance improvement.

Its uses vary widely, which has led to considerable misunderstanding. Studies on competency indicate that competency covers a very complicated and extensive field, with different scientists having different definitions of competency. In 1982, Zemek conducted a study on the definition of competence. He interviewed several specialists in the field of training to evaluate what creates competence. After the interviews, he concluded: "There is no clear and unique agreement about what makes competency." Competency has multiple different meanings, and remains one of the most diffuse terms in the management development sector, and the organizational and occupational literature.

Here are several definitions of competence by various researchers:

- Hayes (1979): Competence generally includes knowledge, motivation, social characteristic and roles, or skills of one person in accordance with the demands of organizations of their clerks.
- Boyatzis (1982): Competence lies in the individual's capacity which superposes the person's behavior with needed parameters as the results of this adaptation make the organization to hire him.
- Albanese (1989): Competence is made of individual characteristics which are used to effect an organization's management.
- Woodruff (1991): Competence is a combination of two topics: personal competence and personal merit at work. Personal merit refers to the skill a person has in a particular work environment. This is dependent on a person's true competence in his/her field.
- Mansfield (1997): The personal specifications which effect a better performance are called competence.
- Standard (2001) ICB (IPMA Competence Baseline): Competence is made of knowledge, personal attitudes, skills and related experiences which are needed for the person's success.
- Rankin (2002): A collection of behaviors and skills which people are expected to show in their organization.
- Unido (United Nations Industrial Development Organization) (2002): Competence is defined as knowledge, skill and specifications which can cause a person to act better. This does not consider their special proficiency in that job.
- Industrial Development Organization of United States (2002): Competence is a collection of personal skills related to knowledge and personal specifications which can create competence in people without having practice and other specialized knowledge.
- CRNBC (College Of Registered Nurses Of British Columbia) (2009): Competence is a collection of knowledge, skills, behavior and power of judging which can cause competence in people without having sufficient practice or specialized knowledge.
- Hay group (2012): Measurable characteristics of a person which are related to efficient actions at work, organization and special culture.

The following definitions are applicable to the term competency:

- Chan and her team (the University of Hong Kong) (2017, 2019): Holistic competency is an umbrella term inclusive of different types of generic skills (e.g. critical thinking, problem-solving skills), positive values, and attitudes (e.g. resilience, appreciation for others) which are essential for students' life-long learning and whole-person development.
- The ARZESH Competency Model (2018): Competency is a series of knowledge, abilities, skills, experiences and behaviors, which leads to effective performance in an individual's activities. Competency is measurable and can be developed through training. It can also be broken down into smaller criteria.

The most recent definition was formalized by Javier Perez-Capdevila in 2017. He stated that competencies are fusions obtained from the complete mixture of the fuzzy sets of aptitudes and attitudes possessed by employees, both in general and singular ways. In these fusions, the degree of belonging to the resulting group expresses the extent to which these competencies are possessed.

== Human resource management ==
Competency is also used as a more general description of requirements for human beings in organizations and communities. Competencies and competency models may be applicable to all employees in an organization or they may be position specific. Competencies are also what people need to be successful in their jobs. Job competencies are not the same as job task. Competencies include all the related knowledge, skills, abilities, and attributes that form a person's job. This set of context-specific qualities is correlated with superior job performance and can be used as a standard against which to measure job performance as well as to develop, recruit, and hire employees.

Competencies provide organizations with a way to define, in behavioral terms, what people need to do to produce the results the organization desires, in a way that is consistent with its culture. By defining competencies within the organization, employees are able to understand what they need to do to be productive. When properly defined, competencies allow organizations to evaluate the extent to which employees are demonstrating the desired behaviors and identify areas where they may be lacking. In areas where employees lack competencies, they can receive training and development. This enables organizations to determine the resources needed to help employees develop and improve those competencies. Competencies can also distinguish and differentiate an organization from its competitors. While two organizations may achieve similar financial results, the methods used to achieve those results may differ based on the competencies that align with their particular strategy and organizational culture. Lastly, competencies provide a structured model that can be used to integrate management practices throughout the organization. Competencies help align recruiting, performance management, training and development, and reward practices to reinforce the key behaviors that the organization values.

Competencies required for a post are identified through job analysis or task analysis, using techniques such as the critical incident technique, work diaries, and work sampling. A future focus is recommended for strategic reasons. If someone is able to do required tasks at the target level of proficiency, they are considered "competent" in that area. For instance, management competency might include system thinking and emotional intelligence, as well as skills in influence and negotiation. Identifying employee competencies can contribute to improved organizational performance. They are most effective if they meet several critical standards, including linkage to, and leverage within an organization's human resource system.

== Competency development ==
The process of competency development is a lifelong series of doing and reflecting. As competencies apply to careers as well as jobs, lifelong competency development is linked with personal development as a management concept. And it requires a special environment, where the rules are necessary in order to introduce novices, but people at a more advanced level of competency will systematically break the rules if the situations requires it. This environment is synonymously described using terms such as learning organization, knowledge creation, self-organizing and empowerment.

Within a specific organization or professional community, professional competency is frequently valued. They are usually the same competencies that must be demonstrated in a job interview. But today there is another way of looking at it: that there are general areas of occupational competency required to retain a post, or earn a promotion. For all organizations and communities there is a set of primary tasks that competent people have to contribute to all the time. For a university student, for example, the primary tasks could be handling theory, methods or the information of an assignment.

In emergencies, competent people may react to a situation following behaviors they have previously found successful. To be competent a person would need to be able to interpret the situation in the context and have a repertoire of possible actions to take. Being sufficiently trained in each possible action included in their repertoire can make a great difference. Regardless of training, competency grows through experience and the extent of an individual's capacity to learn and adapt. Research has found that it is not easy to assess competencies and competence development.

=== Skill acquisition ===
Dreyfus and Dreyfus introduced nomenclature for the levels of competence in competency development. The five levels proposed by Dreyfus and Dreyfus are part of what is now referred to as the Dreyfus model of skill acquisition:

1. Novice: Rule-based behavior, strongly limited and inflexible
2. Experienced Beginner: Incorporates aspects of the situation
3. Practitioner: Acting consciously from long-term goals and plans
4. Knowledgeable practitioner: Sees the situation as a whole and acts from personal conviction
5. Expert: Has an intuitive understanding of the situation and zooms in on the central aspects

=== Four areas of competency ===
Dreyfus and Dreyfus also introduced four general areas of competency:

1. Meaning competency: The person assessed must be able to identify with the purpose of the organization or community and act from the preferred future in accordance with the values of the organization or community.
2. Relation competency: The ability to create and nurture connections to the stakeholders of the primary tasks must be shown.
3. Learning competency: The person assessed must be able to create and look for situations that make it possible to experiment with the set of solutions that make it possible to complete the primary tasks and reflect on the experience.
4. Change competency: The person assessed must be able to act in new ways when it will promote the purpose of the organization or community and make the preferred future come to life.

=== Four stages of competence ===
The four stages of competence arranged as a pyramid

In psychology, the four stages of competence, or the "conscious competence" learning model, relates to the psychological states involved in the process of progressing from incompetence to competence in a skill. People may have several skills, some unrelated to each other, and each skill will typically be at one of the stages at a given time. Many skills require practice to remain at a high level of competence.

The four stages suggest that individuals are initially unaware of how little they know, or unconscious of their incompetence. As they recognize their incompetence, they consciously acquire a skill, then consciously use it. Eventually, the skill can be utilized without it being consciously thought through: the individual is said to have then acquired unconscious competence.

== Types of competencies ==
Fayek & Omar (2016) have formulated six types of competencies in relation to the construction industry:

1. Behavioral competencies: Individual performance competencies are more specific than organizational competencies and capabilities. As such, it is important that they be defined in a measurable behavioral context in order to validate applicability and the degree of expertise (e.g. development of talent)
2. Core competencies: Capabilities and/or technical expertise unique to an organization, i.e. core competencies differentiate an organization from its competition (e.g. the technologies, methodologies, strategies or processes of the organization that create competitive advantage in the marketplace). An organizational core competency is an organization's strategic strength. Core competencies differentiate an organization from its competition and create a company's competitive advantage in the marketplace.
3. Functional competencies: Functional competencies are job-specific competencies that drive proven high-performance, quality results for a given position. They are often technical or operational in nature (e.g., "backing up a database" is a functional competency).
4. Management competencies: Management competencies identify the specific attributes and capabilities that illustrate an individual's management potential. Unlike leadership characteristics, management characteristics can be learned and developed with the proper training and resources. Competencies in this category should demonstrate pertinent behaviors for management to be effective.
5. Organizational competencies: The mission, vision, values, culture and core competencies of the organization that sets the tone and/or context in which the work of the organization is carried out (e.g. customer-driven, risk taking and cutting edge). How we treat the patient is part of the patient's treatment.
6. Technical competencies: Depending on the position, both technical and performance capabilities should be weighed carefully as employment decisions are made. For example, organizations that tend to hire or promote solely on the basis of technical skills, i.e. to the exclusion of other competencies, may experience an increase in performance-related issues (e.g. systems software designs versus relationship management skills)

== Examples of competences ==
Here are some examples of competences:

Attention to detail
Is alert in a high-risk environment; follows detailed procedures and ensures accuracy in documentation and data; carefully monitors gauges, instruments or processes; concentrates on routine work details; organizes and maintains a system of records.
Commitment to safety
Understands, encourages and carries out the principles of integrated safety management; complies with or oversees the compliance with Laboratory safety policies and procedures; completes all required ES&H training; takes personal responsibility for safety.
Communication
Writes and speaks effectively, using conventions proper to the situation; states own opinions clearly and concisely; demonstrates openness and honesty; listens well during meetings and feedback sessions; explains reasoning behind own opinions; asks others for their opinions and feedback; asks questions to ensure understanding; exercises a professional approach with others using all appropriate tools of communication; uses consideration and tact when offering opinions.
Cooperation/teamwork
Works harmoniously with others to get a job done; responds positively to instructions and procedures; able to work well with staff, co-workers, peers and managers; shares critical information with everyone involved in a project; works effectively on projects that cross functional lines; helps to set a tone of cooperation within the work group and across groups; coordinates own work with others; seeks opinions; values working relationships; when appropriate facilitates discussion before decision-making process is complete.
Customer service
Listens and responds effectively to customer questions; resolves customer problems to the customer's satisfaction; respects all internal and external customers; uses a team approach when dealing with customers; follows up to evaluate customer satisfaction; measures customer satisfaction effectively; commits to exceeding customer expectations.
Flexibility
Remains open-minded and changes opinions on the basis of new information; performs a wide variety of tasks and changes focus quickly as demands change; manages transitions from task to task effectively; adapts to varying customer needs.
Job knowledge/technical knowledge
Demonstrates knowledge of techniques, skills, equipment, procedures and materials. Applies knowledge to identify issues and internal problems; works to develop additional technical knowledge and skills.
Initiative and creativity
Plans work and carries out tasks without detailed instructions; makes constructive suggestions; prepares for problems or opportunities in advance; undertakes additional responsibilities; responds to situations as they arise with minimal supervision; creates novel solutions to problems; evaluates new technology as potential solutions to existing problems.
Innovation
Able to challenge conventional practices; adapts established methods for new uses; pursues ongoing system improvement; creates novel solutions to problems; evaluates new technology as potential solutions to existing problems.
Judgement
Makes sound decisions; bases decisions on fact rather than emotion; analyzes problems skillfully; uses logic to reach solutions.
Leadership
Able to become a role model for the team and lead from the front. Reliable and have the capacity to motivate subordinates. Solves problems and takes important decisions.
Organization
Able to manage multiple projects; able to determine project urgency in a practical way; uses goals to guide actions; creates detailed action plans; organizes and schedules people and tasks effectively.
Problem solving
Anticipates problems; sees how a problem and its solution will affect other units; gathers information before making decisions; weighs alternatives against objectives and arrives at reasonable decisions; adapts well to changing priorities, deadlines and directions; works to eliminate all processes which do not add value; is willing to take action, even under pressure, criticism or tight deadlines; takes informed risks; recognizes and accurately evaluates the signs of a problem; analyzes current procedures for possible improvements; notifies supervisor of problems in a timely manner.
Quality control
Establishes high standards and measures; is able to maintain high standards despite pressing deadlines; does work right the first time and inspects work for flaws; tests new methods thoroughly; considers excellence a fundamental priority.
Quality of work
Maintains high standards despite pressing deadlines; does work right the first time; corrects own errors; regularly produces accurate, thorough, professional work.
Quantity of work
Produces an appropriate quantity of work; does not get bogged down in unnecessary detail; able to manage multiple projects; able to determine project urgency in a meaningful and practical way; organizes and schedules people and tasks.
Reliability
Personally responsible; completes work in a timely, consistent manner; works hours necessary to complete assigned work; is regularly present and punctual; arrives prepared for work; is committed to doing the best job possible; keeps commitments.
Responsiveness to requests for service
Responds to requests for service in a timely and thorough manner; does what is necessary to ensure customer satisfaction; prioritizes customer needs; follows up to evaluate customer satisfaction.
Staff development
Works to improve the performance of oneself and others by pursuing opportunities for continuous learning/feedback; constructively helps and coaches others in their professional development; exhibits a “can-do” approach and inspires associates to excel; develops a team spirit.
Support of diversity
Treats all people with respect; values diverse perspectives; participates in diversity training opportunities; provides a supportive work environment for the multicultural workforce; applies the employer's philosophy of equal employment opportunity; shows sensitivity to individual differences; treats others fairly without regard to race, sex, color, religion, or sexual orientation; recognizes differences as opportunities to learn and gain by working together; values and encourages unique skills and talents; seeks and considers diverse perspectives and ideas.

== Competency models ==
Many Human Resource professionals are employing a competitive competency model to strengthen nearly every facet of talent management—from recruiting and performance management, to training and development, to succession planning and more. A job competency model is a comprehensive, behaviorally based job description that both potential and current employees and their managers can use to measure and manage performance and establish development plans. Often there is an accompanying visual representative competency profile as well.

One of the most common pitfalls organizations encounter when creating a competency model is focusing too much on job descriptions rather than on employee behaviors. Experts state that the steps required to create a competency model include:

1. Gathering information about job roles.
2. Interviewing subject matter experts to discover current critical competencies and how they envision their roles changing in the future.
3. Identifying high-performer behaviors.
4. Creating, reviewing (or vetting) and delivering the competency model.

Once the competency model has been created, the final step involves communicating how the organization plans to use the competency model to support initiatives such as recruiting, performance management, career development, succession planning as well as other HR business processes.

== See also ==
- Circle of competence – Subject area matching a person's skills or expertise
- Competency architecture – Framework of skills used in competency-based learning
- Competency dictionary – Competency within an organization
- Dunning–Kruger effect – Cognitive bias about one's own skill, the tendency for incompetent people to grossly overestimate their skills
- Outline of business management – Overview of and topical guide to business management
- Personal development – Activities that develop a person's capabilities and potential
- Performance appraisal – Method to document and evaluate an employee's job performance
- Performance improvement – Business improvement process
- Peter principle – Management concept by Laurence J. Peter, the tendency for competent workers to be promoted just beyond the level of their competence
- Professional development – Learning to earn or maintain professional credentials
- Seagull manager – Dysfunctional management style, management style
- Clandestine HUMINT operational techniques – Clandestine espionage methods for collecting intelligence from human sources
