= Responsible position =

A responsible position is a post where the individual is expected to work without supervision or a higher authority, usually for a political purpose or a civil service position. Whether a particular position is a responsible position or "least difficult" is not a dichotomy, but rather "relative" and a continuum.

This is in contrast to a job or police/military post, where there is a superior officer to answer to and who holds the right to direct work. For example, a shop steward and a member of parliament are in responsible positions; the former is responsible to the workers, the latter to the electorate.

Working in a responsible position may be unpaid, or if there is some compensation, it may not be considered a taxable salary. For example, the compensation of an MP is tax-free.

The related term position of trust refers to any kind of position, whether supervisory or not.

== See also ==
- Dress code
- Hierarchy
- Peter principle
