= Competence-based management =

Performance-oriented organizational operation

Competence-based strategic management is a way of thinking about how organizations gain high performance for a significant period of time. Established as a theory in the early 1990s, competence-based strategic management theory explains how organizations can develop sustainable competitive advantage in a systematic and structural way. The theory of competence-based strategic management is an integrative strategy theory that incorporates economic, organizational and behavioural concerns in a framework that is dynamic, systemic, cognitive and holistic (Sanchez and Heene, 2004). This theory defines competence as: the ability to sustain the coordinated deployment of resources in ways that helps an organization achieve its goals (creating and distributing value to customers and stakeholders). Competence-based management can be found in areas other than strategic management, namely in human resource management.

== Aspects of the competent organization ==
First, competence must include the ability to respond to the dynamic nature of an organization's external environment and of its own internal processes. The requirement of sustainability in the above definition of competence encompasses both forms of dynamics. To be sustainable, a competence must respond to the dynamics of the external environment by enabling an organization to maintain its ability to create value in the marketplace even as changes take place in market preferences and available technologies. Sustainability also requires overcoming internal organizational dynamics that result in various forms of organizational entropy, such as a gradual loss of organizational focus, a narrowing and increasing rigidity in the patterns of activity the organization can or does perform, a progressive lowering of organizational expectations for performance and success, and the like. The notion of organizational entropy reflects the concept of entropy in the laws of thermodynamics. The essential feature of the law of entropy is that systems naturally tend to devolve to lower states of energy, which takes the form of a loss of structure and information content. Ongoing inputs of energy are required simply to maintain a system in its current state of structure and information. Further inputs of energy are then required to increase the structure and information content of a system. Analogously, in organizations as systems, managers must provide continuous inputs of energy and attention to maintain or improve the order and structure in an organization's value-creation processes.

Second, competence must include an ability to manage the systemic nature of organizations and of their interactions with other organizations. The requirement of coordination of resources addresses this dimension of competence. In the first instance, competence requires an ability to coordinate an organization's own organization-specific resources – i.e., the resources within the boundaries of the organization and thus under its direct control – in processes of creating value through product creation and realization. In addition, competence involves accessing and coordinating important organization-addressable resources that lie beyond the boundaries of the organization. Providers of key organization-addressable resources include materials and components suppliers, distributors, consultants, financial institutions and customers.

Third, competence must include an ability to manage the cognitive processes of an organization. The requirement of deployment of resources – directing organizational resources to specific value-creating activities – addresses this dimension of competence. Organization's managers are ultimately responsible for deciding the ways in which an organization will try to create value in its targeted product markets. Thus, achieving organizational competence poses a twofold cognitive challenge to managers. Managers must be able to ascertain and assure that an organization's operations meet at least the minimum efficiency requirements needed to carry out the strategies of the organization, but they must also be able to define and select strategies that have the potential to create value in targeted markets when they are carried out efficiently. In other words, managers are responsible for both efficient and effective use of an organization's resources.

Fourth, competence must include the ability to manage the holistic nature of an organization as an open system. The requirement of goal achievement addresses the multiplicity of individual and institutional interests that intermingle in and are served through any organization. To lead an organization in achieving goals requires that managers be able to define organizational goals that promise a satisfactory level of goal achievement for all individual and institutional providers of the essential resources the organization needs. Thus, the definition of organizational competence recognizes the existence of multiple stakeholders and the importance of meeting the expectations of all providers of essential resources in sustaining the value-creating processes of an organization.

== Five modes of competence ==
Each competence mode arises from a specific level of activity with an organization as an open system. The term mode of competence is used in this discussion to refer to an important way in which the competence of an organization is expressed through specific kinds of activities and processes. Further, as the discussion below explains, each competence mode results from a distinctive kind of organizational flexibility to respond to changing and diverse environmental conditions, such as evolving market demands, technological change and competitive developments in an industry. Each kind of flexibility can in turn be described by the kind of portfolio of strategic options that each flexibility brings to an organization.

Competence mode I: cognitive flexibility to imagine alternative strategic logics. Competence mode I derives from the cognitive flexibility of an organization to conceive of alternative ways of creating value in markets. The source of this mode of competence is, in essence, the collective corporate imagination of an organization's managers in perceiving feasible market opportunities for the organization to create value. Competence mode I depends on an organization's managers’ ability to perceive market needs and identify specific market preferences the organization might serve, to determine the characteristics of products and services that can satisfy those needs and preferences, to design supply chains and select appropriate distribution channels for realizing new products, and ultimately to define product offers that will be perceived by markets as having attractive net delivered customer value.

Competence mode II: cognitive flexibility to imagine alternative management processes. Competence mode II results from a second form of cognitive flexibility of managers to conceive of alternative management processes for implementing strategic logics identified by competence mode I. The managerial abilities underlying competence mode II include the ability to identify the kinds of resources (assets, knowledge and capabilities) required to carry out a given strategic logic, to create effective organization designs (allocations of tasks, decision making and information flows) for the processes that will use the required resources and to define appropriate controls and incentives for monitoring and motivating the value-creating processes envisioned by a given strategic logic.

Competence mode III: coordination flexibility to identify, configure and deploy resources. Competence mode III drives from the coordination flexibility of an organization to assemble chains of tangible and intangible resources needed to carry out the organization's strategic logics for creating value through its product offers. Coordination flexibility depends on the ability of a firm's managers—in this case, usually the midlevel managers of larger firms, but also top managers of smaller firms—to acquire or access, configure and deploy chains of resources for leveraging product offers capable of creating value in the markets targeted by the firm.

Competence mode IV: resource flexibility to be used in alternative operations. While competence mode III derives from the ability of an organization to assemble resource chains in support of product offers, competence mode IV derives from the ability of the resources in an organization's resource chains to be used in alternative ways. In essence, within the resource chains available to an organization, the intrinsic resource flexibility of the resources composing those chains will constrain the different ways in which the organization's available resource chains can be used.

Competence mode V: operating flexibility in applying skills and capabilities to available resources. While competence mode IV derives from the intrinsic flexibilities of the resources in a resource chain to be used in alternative processes, competence mode V derives from the ability of an organization to use the flexibilities of its firm-specific and firm-addressable resources effectively and efficiently over a range of operating conditions.
