= Parkinson's Law =

Adage that work expands to fill its available time

- Author: C. Northcote Parkinson
- Illustrator: Osbert Lancaster
- Publisher: Houghton Mifflin / John Murray
- Publication date: 1957 / April 1958

Parkinson's Law is the title of a satirical essay by the naval historian C. Northcote Parkinson which was published in The Economist in 1955, following the report of the Royal Commission on the Civil Service. Its notable findings were that:

- Work expands so as to fill the time available for its completion.
- The number of workers within public administration tends to grow, regardless of the amount of work to be done.

The essay starts by giving the first finding as a "commonplace observation" while the bulk of the essay discusses the second, which Parkinson detailed as due to "The Law of Multiplication of Subordinates" and "The Law of Multiplication of Work".

The first finding has been called the personal version of the law and the second, which is not stated explicitly, the organizational version. It is the first sense which is now most commonly called Parkinson's Law. Despite their facetious origins, these findings have been widely adopted in management science and social psychology.

The essay was developed into a book, Parkinson's Law or The Pursuit of Progress, which was first published in the United States by Houghton Mifflin Company (Boston) in 1957 and then in Britain by John Murray in 1958. This explored other dysfunctions of bureaucracies and committees such as the law of triviality – "The time spent on any item of the agenda will be in inverse proportion to the sum involved" – which is now known as "bike-shedding" after the book's case study of a committee considering a nuclear reactor and then its bike shed.

== First observation ==
The first meaning – "Work expands to fill the available time" – has inspired various facetious corollaries, the best known being the Stock-Sanford corollary to Parkinson's law:

If you wait until the last minute, it only takes a minute to do.

the Asimov corollary to Parkinson's law:

In ten hours a day you have time to fall twice as far behind your commitments as in five hours a day.

as well as corollaries relating to computers, such as:

Data expands to fill the space available for storage.

== Second observation ==
The second sense was the main focus of the essay published in The Economist, and reprinted with other similar essays in the successful 1958 book Parkinson's Law: The Pursuit of Progress. The book was translated into many languages. It was popular in the Soviet Union and its sphere of influence. In 1986, Alessandro Natta complained about the swelling bureaucracy in Italy. Mikhail Gorbachev responded that "Parkinson's law works everywhere".

Parkinson derived the dictum from his extensive experience in the British Civil Service. He gave, as examples, the growth in the size of the British Admiralty and Colonial Office even though the numbers of, respectively, their ships and colonies were declining.

Much of the essay is dedicated to a summary of purportedly scientific observations supporting the law, such as the increase in the number of employees at the Colonial Office while the British Empire declined (he showed that it had its greatest number of staff when it was folded into the Foreign Office due to a lack of colonies to administer). He explained this growth using two forces: (1) "An official wants to multiply subordinates, not rivals", and (2) "Officials make work for each other." He noted that the number employed in a bureaucracy rose by 5–7% per year "irrespective of any variation in the amount of work (if any) to be done".

=== Formula ===
Parkinson presented the growth as a mock-scientific mathematical equation describing the rate at which bureaucracies expand over time.

Observing that the promotion of employees necessitated the hiring of subordinates, and that the time used to answer minutes requires more work, Parkinson stated: "In any public administrative department not actually at war the staff increase may be expected to follow this formula" (for a given year):
$$x=\frac{2k^m+P}{n}$$
where:

- x – number of new employees to be hired annually
- k – number of employees who want to be promoted by hiring new employees
- m – number of working hours per person for the preparation of internal memoranda (micropolitics)
- P – difference: age at hiring − age at retirement
- n – number of administrative files actually completed.

== Related efficiency ==
In a different essay included in the book, Parkinson proposed a rule about the efficiency of administrative councils. He defined a "coefficient of inefficiency" with the number of members as the main determining variable. This is a semi-humorous attempt to define the size at which a committee or other decision-making body becomes completely inefficient.

In Parkinson's Law: The Pursuit of Progress, London: John Murray, 1958 a chapter is devoted to the basic question of what he called comitology: how committees, government cabinets, and other such bodies are created and eventually grow irrelevant, or are initially designed as such. The word comitology has recently been independently invented by the European Union for a different, non-humorous meaning.

Empirical evidence is drawn from historical and contemporary government cabinets. Most often, the minimal size of a state's most powerful and prestigious body is five members. From English history, Parkinson notes a number of bodies that lost power as they grew:

- The first cabinet was the Council of the Crown, now the House of Lords, which grew from an unknown number to 29, to 50 before 1600, by which time it had lost much of its power.
- A new body was appointed in 1257, the "Lords of the King's Council", numbering fewer than 10. The body grew, and ceased to meet when it had 172 members.
- The third incarnation was the Privy Council, initially also numbering fewer than 10 members, rising to 47 in 1679.
- In 1715, the Privy Council lost power to the Cabinet Council with eight members, rising to 20 by 1725.
- Around 1740, the Cabinet Council was superseded by an inner group, called the Cabinet, initially with five members. At the time of Parkinson's study (the 1950s), the Cabinet was still the official governing body. Parkinson observed that, from 1939 on, there was an effort to save the Cabinet as an institution. The membership had been fluctuating from a high of 23 members in 1939, down to 18 in 1954.
- Since Parkinson wrote, the size of the Cabinet has grown to 27 members in 2025. Especially since Tony Blair, UK Prime Ministers have been repeatedly criticised for governing mainly with an inner circle or Kitchen Cabinet.

A detailed mathematical expression is proposed by Parkinson for the coefficient of inefficiency, featuring many possible influences. In 2008, an attempt was made to empirically verify the proposed model. Parkinson's conjecture that membership exceeding a number "between 19.9 and 22.4" makes a committee manifestly inefficient seems well justified by the evidence proposed.

Less certain is the optimal number of members, which must lie between three, a logical minimum, and 20. Within a group of 20, factions or various individual discussions may occur, some of which may substitute for or displace the working of the whole committee, thus diluting the power of the leader, the chair of the committee proper. That it may be eight seems arguable but is not supported by observation: no contemporary government cabinet in Parkinson's data set had eight members, and only king Charles I of England had a Committee of State of that size.

== See also ==
- Bureaucratic drift
- Dilbert principle
- Gustafson's law
- Hofstadter's law
- Lewis–Mogridge position
- Induced demand
- Iron triangle
- Jevons paradox
- Law of triviality
- List of eponymous laws
- Peter principle
- Planning fallacy
- Reference class forecasting
- Roemer's law
- SnackWell effect
- Student syndrome
- Time management
- Zawinski's Law
