= Youssef Fayek =

Libyan footballer (born 2000)

Personal information
- Full name: Youssef Ahmed Youssef Al-Karmali
- Date of birth: 18 March 2000 (age 26)
- Place of birth: Libya
- Position: Striker

Team information
- Current team: Olympic Azzaweya

Senior career*
| Years | Team | Apps | (Gls) |
| –2021 | Al-Madina | | |
| 2021– | Olympic Azzaweya | | |

International career^{‡}
| 2022– | Libya | 1 | (0) |
- * Club domestic league appearances and goals ‡ National team caps and goals as of 19:09, 10 February 2022 (UTC)

Youssef Fayek (born 18 March 2000) is a Libyan footballer who currently plays for Olympic Azzaweya of the Libyan Premier League, and the Libya national team.

== International career ==
Fayek made his senior international debut on 29 January 2022 in a friendly loss to Kuwait.

=== International career statistics ===
As of match played 29 January 2022

Libya national team
| Year | Apps | Goals |
|---|---|---|
| 2022 | 1 | 0 |
| Total | 1 | 0 |
