= Fayek Matta Ishak =

Egyptian Canadian coptologist, author and scholar (1922–2006)

- Born: October 29, 1922; Godayida Sharkia, Egypt
- Died: October 30, 2006 (aged 84); Canada
- Education: University of Liverpool; University of Exeter; Cairo University
- Known for: Founder/author of the Coptologia Journal
- Scientific career
- Fields: Coptology

Fayek Matta Ishak (October 29, 1922 – October 30, 2006) was an Egyptian Canadian coptologist, author and scholar. He was the founder and editor-in-chief of Coptologia Publications, a journal into Coptic Thought and Spirituality. He was also the author and publisher of the first English translation of the Liturgy of St. Basil (4th century) into Jamesian English (1611) from Arabic at the request of Pope Shenouda III of Alexandria.

== Early life ==
Ishak was born in the heart of the Nile Delta in Godayida Sharkia, Egypt. During his youth studies at Cairo University, his colleague Father Antonios, who would later become Pope Shenouda III of Alexandria, sought him out in order to translate his JK-Gr 12 composition of Sunday school lessons from Arabic into English. These lessons have been utilized for decades across North American Coptic churches.

== Professional works ==
Prof. Ishak is internationally recognized as a researcher and publisher on Coptology, and is credited for raising awareness of Coptic Orthodoxy in North America. Adjacent to his journal Coptologia, which had contributions from renowned Coptologists such as Aziz Suryal Atiya, Otto Meinardus and Iris Habib Elmasry, he also wrote numerous books and countless articles on Coptic theology, heritage and mysticism.

== Selected books ==
- The Coptic Holy Icon (2006). ISBN 978-0-921604-05-1.
- Coptologia Journal Volumes I-XX (1981-2006)
- Saint Catherine of Sinai and the Monastery Named After Her (2002). ISBN 978-0-921604-19-8.
- Spiritual Treasury of Fr. Matthew the Poor (1998). ISBN 978-0-921604-09-9.
- A Source Book of Alexandrine Orthodoxy (1997). ISBN 978-0-921604-08-2.
- The Coptic Orthodox Horologion: The Book of the Seven Nocturnal and Daylight Canonical Prayers (1992). ISBN 978-0-921604-15-0.
- The Mystical Philosophy of T.S. Eliot (1970).

== Selected articles/poems ==
- The Spirituality of the Coptic Orthodox Church and its Distinct Characteristics Coptologia Journal Volume XIX (2003).
- The Metaphysics of Eschatological Soteriology as Pertained to the Cyrillian Christology Coptologia Journal Volume XVIII (2002).
- "By the Gates of Eden" (2002).
- The Landmarks of Coptic Patrology Coptologia Journal Volume XVII (2001).
- "On Seeing Through a Glass Darkly" (2000).
- "The Quest After the Unknown" (1999).
- What is the Codex Alexandrinus? Coptologia Volume XI (1990).
- My Interview With His Reverence Fr. Matta Al-Maskin The Spiritual Father of the Monastery of St Macarius the Great Coptologia Journal Volume III (1982).
- Monophysitism Versus Diophysitism: Eutychianism Clarified and Defined. Coptologia Volume II (1982).

== Selected Symposium Presentations ==
- Thirteenth International Conference on Patristic Studies The Clementine Connaissance and the Hermeneutical Knowability of the Higher Gnosis of Being, University of Oxford, England (1999).
- Thirteenth International Conference on Patristic Studies Means of Partaking of the Divinity of the Paedagogus and the Wisdom of the Protrepticus, University of Oxford, England (1999).
- Sixth International Congress of Coptic Studies The Orthodox Eschatological and Ontological Metaphysics of Being, University of Münster, Germany (1996).
- American Research Center for Egyptian Studies On Reviving the Serapiana and the Alexandriana of the Ancient World, University of Philadelphia, USA (1989).
- International Congress on the Social Sciences and the Humanities Revelatory Insights and Afterlife Knowability in the Light of Patristic Studies, University of Michigan, USA (1983).
- Inter-denominational Conference on Religious Studies Is the Son of God the Son of God? An Inquiry into the Hypostasis and Ousia The Triumph of Athanasian Orthodoxy, Lakehead University, Thunder Bay, Ontario 1982.
- Eleventh Conference on Medieval Studies Eliot and the Medieval Contemplatives, University of Michigan, USA, (1976).

== The Coptic Encyclopedia- Contributions By Fayek M. Ishak ==
- Greek and Coptic Papyrus Codices and Scrolls Copt Net Archives
- The Monastery Of Moses The Black Vol.3, 1991, p. 708
- Dar Yuhannis Kama Vol.3, 1991, p. 883
- Dar Yuhannis Al-Qasir Vol.3, 1991, p. 883-84
- Virgin Mary, Apparition Of The Vol.7, 1991, pp. 2308-2310

== Selected awards ==
- Centro Culturale Copto Ortodosso Gold Medal Award for scholarly distinction from Venezia, Italia presented by Abba Marcos Metropolitan of France 1986.
- Canadian Ministry of Culture and Recreation Grant Awarded to Coptologia 1981.
- Scholarly Achievement The International Registry of Profiles, Cambridge, United Kingdom 1976.

== Accolades ==
- Graduate Scholarships and Awards The Ishak Book Prize, Lakehead University 1989.

== Academic career ==
- Professor Emeritus English Literature Lakehead University 1987–2006.
- Professor and former Chairman of English Literature Lakehead University 1968–1987.
- Assistant Professor English Literature Notre Dame University of Nelson 1966–1967.
- Phd English Literature University of Liverpool 1962.
- Masters of English Literature University of Exeter 1954.
- Diploma of Linguistics and Translation Institute of Higher Studies Cairo, Egypt 1951.
- BA English Literature University of Cairo 1945.
