= Robert W. White (psychologist) =

American psychologist

Robert W. White (1904–2001) was an American psychologist whose professional interests centered on the study of personality, both normal and abnormal. His book The Abnormal Personality, published in 1948, became the standard textbook on Abnormal Psychology.

A historian in perspective, White did not focus entirely on abnormal psychology, but investigated the coping methods of normal people. Diverging from Freud whose thinking dominated psychology at the time, he emphasized that individuals were also driven by needs to be competent and effective in the world.

He began teaching at Harvard University in 1937 and retired from teaching in 1964. During World War II, White became acting director of Harvard's psychological clinic. He was head of Harvard's clinical psychology program and chairman of the social relations department. In 1969 he was awarded professor emeritus.

He graduated from Harvard University in 1925.

== Influence on positive psychology ==
Robert White’s theory of competence inspired Martin Seligman in developing the PERMA model, particularly the Accomplishment element, which relates to White’s idea of mastery over the environment.

== Selected publications ==
- The Abnormal Psychology (1948)
- Lives in Progress: A Study of the Natural Growth of Personality (1952)
- "Motivation reconsidered: The concept of competence"
- "Prediction of hypnotic susceptibility from a knowledge of subjects' attitudes" Journal of Psychology (1936)
- "Introductions to historical psychology"
