= Aminah Robinson Fayek =

Canadian civil engineer

Aminah Robinson Fayek is a Canadian civil engineer and academic administrator, the vice president for research at the University of Alberta. Her research involves the application of fuzzy logic to decision theory and risk management in the construction industry. At the University of Alberta, she holds a (tier 1) Canada Research Chair in Fuzzy Hybrid Decision Support Systems for Construction and an NSERC Senior Industrial Research Chair in Strategic Construction Modeling and Delivery.

== Education and career ==
Fayek studied civil engineering at McGill University, where she graduated with a bachelor's degree in 1991. She continued her studies with a master's degree in construction engineering and management at the University of British Columbia in 1992, and then traveled to Australia for a Ph.D. in construction engineering and project management, completed at the University of Melbourne in 1997.

She joined the faculty at the University of Alberta in 1997, and reached the rank of full professor in 2004, and held the Ledcor Professorship in Construction Engineering beginning in 2008. She was given the Canada Research Chair in Fuzzy Hybrid Decision Support Systems for Construction in 2017, and appointed as vice president for research at the University of Alberta in 2021.

== Recognition ==
Fayek was the 2012 recipient of the Walter Shanly Award of the Canadian Society for Civil Engineering, and the 2019 recipient of the Peurifoy Construction Research Award of the American Society of Civil Engineers. She was named the year's Outstanding Woman in Innovation – Research at the 2024 Alberta Science and Technology (ASTech) Awards.

She was elected as a Fellow of the Canadian Society for Civil Engineering in 2020. In the same year she was elected to the US-based National Academy of Construction. She was named as a Fellow of the Canadian Academy of Engineering in 2025.
