= Richard Boyatzis =

American psychologist (born 1946)

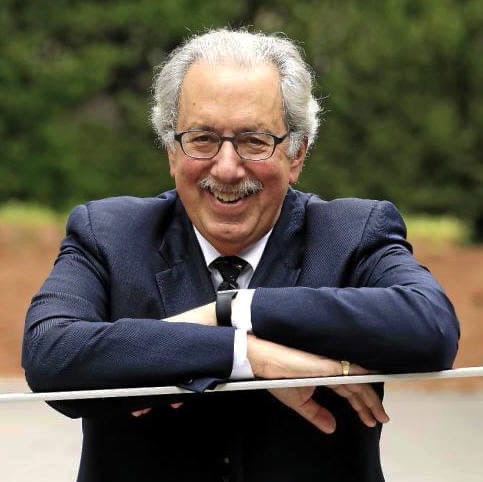
- Born: October 1, 1946 (age 79); New York City, NY, U.S.
- Education: MIT (B.S.); Harvard University (M.S., Ph.D)
- Occupations: Author, psychologist, research scientist

Richard Eleftherios Boyatzis (born October 1, 1946) is a Greek-American organizational theorist and Distinguished University Professor of Case Western Reserve University and a professor in the Departments of Organizational Behavior, Psychology, and Cognitive Science at Case Western Reserve University, as well as H. Clark Ford Professor. He is considered an expert in the field of emotional intelligence, behavior change, leadership, neuroscience, and competencies.

== Biography ==
Boyatzis acquired his bachelor's degree in aeronautics and astronautics from MIT before going on to obtain his MS and PhD in social psychology from Harvard University, and is a Board Certified Coach. He was awarded an Honorary Doctorate from ESADE Ramon Llull University in 2017.

== Career ==
Boyatzis’ career blends academia, corporate leadership, and consulting. After initial work as a Research Engineer at Northrop from 1966 to 1967, he transitioned to psychology, serving as a Consulting Psychologist at the Veterans Administration Hospital from 1971 to 1973, where he treated alcohol addiction. His corporate career began 1972 as a researcher and then in 1976 as president and CEO of McBer and Company in which he served until 1987, a human resource consultancy later absorbed into The Hay Group and even later into Korn Ferry. At McBer, he pioneered competency modeling, linking managerial success to measurable skills. He later became COO of Yankelovich, Skelly & White, a market research firm, where he advanced data-driven strategies.

In 1987, Boyatzis joined Case Western Reserve University, ascending to the HR Horvitz Chair of Family Business in 2007, then Distinguished University Professor in 2010 and H. Clark Ford Professor in 2022. He chaired the Department of Organizational Behavior from1996 to 2004 and served as Associate Dean of Executive Education from 1994 to 1999, expanding global executive programs. He holds secondary appointments in Cognitive Science and Psychology. Internationally, he held visiting roles at ESADE for twenty years and at the London Business School.

Boyatzis advises institutions like the MD Anderson Leadership Institute and the International Coaching Federation. His work extends to nonprofit boards, including the Cleveland Botanical Gardens, Council on Adult and Experiential Learning and the Caleb Foundation.

== Work ==
He is the author of more than 200 scholarly articles and 75 practitioner articles on coaching, leadership, competencies, emotional intelligence, neuroscience and management education. His Coursera MOOCs on leadership, emotional intelligence and coaching have over one and a half million visitors and enrolments from 215 countries.

Using his Intentional Change Theory, Richard studies sustained, desired change at all levels of human endeavor. He began research on helping and coaching in 1967 and coaching executives in 1969. Thirty years ago, he launched a series of longitudinal studies on coaching, followed by three fMRI and two hormonal studies of coaching processes that are effective in helping people be open to change. Using his work from 1970 as one of the founders of the competency movement in HR, he has launched several landmark studies on the competencies of coaches that predict client change.

Boyatzis is a frequent speaker on the international circuit, having delivered speeches and seminars on all seven continents and 65 countries. He has consulted to many Fortune 500 companies, government agencies and organizations in the Americas, Europe and Asia on various topics including executive and management development, organization structure, culture change, R&D productivity, economic development, selection, promotion, performance appraisal and career planning. Boyatzis is a Member, Consortium on Research on Emotional Intelligence; Member of editorial board, Journal of Management Education; Founding member, Academy of Management Learning and Education; Fellow of the Association of Psychological Science, the Society of Industrial and Organizational Psychology, and the American Psychological Association.

His 10 books include: The Competent Manager (in 2 languages); the international best-seller, Primal Leadership with Daniel Goleman and Annie McKee (in 31 languages); Resonant Leadership with Annie McKee (in 19 languages), Becoming a Resonant Leader, with Annie McKee and Francis Johnston (in 7 languages), and Transforming Qualitative Information (in 2 languages), Helping People Change: Coaching with Compassion for Lifelong Learning and Growth with Melvin Smith and Ellen Van Oosten (in 10 languages, named on Teambuilding.com list one of the “11 Best Coaching Books to Read for Work in 2022.”), and the most recent The Science of Change: Discovering Sustained, Desired Change from Individuals to Teams, Organizations to Communities.

== Research ==
Boyatzis’ research bridges psychology, neuroscience, and management. His 1982 book, The Competent Manager, helped HR by defining competencies as predictors of managerial success. Collaborating with Daniel Goleman and Annie McKee, he co-authored Primal Leadership (2002), a work linking emotional intelligence to leadership on national best seller lists for over a year and a half. This book, translated into 31 languages.

His Intentional Change Theory explores sustained desired change at all levels of human endeavor from individual to dyad, team, organizational, community and country change. This work informed Helping People Change (2019) co -authored with Professors Melvin Smith and Ellen Van Oosten.

Boyatzis’ interdisciplinary approach integrates organizational neuroscience. As a founder of the Organizational Neuroscience Interest Group at the Academy of Management, he examines leadership's biological underpinnings.

== Awards and honors ==
- Christopher J. Peterson Gold Medal (2023)
- Lifetime Achievement Award (2022) from Academy of Management Organizational Neuroscience Division
- Top 50 Global Thinkers in Coaching, Top 50 Thinkers. (2021).
- Lifetime Achievement Award for Contributions to Leadership Coaching, Coaching at Work. (2020).
- Fellow, American Psychological Association. (2020).
- No.1 Coach Academic Influencer, Thinkers 50, Top 50 Coaches Worldwide. (2019).
- Fellow, Society for Industrial and Organizational Psychology. (2019).
- Vision of Excellence Award for the Science of Coaching, Institute of Coaching. (2018).
- Distinctive Contribution to the field of Project Management, International Society for Project Management. (2017).
- Archer Lifetime Achievement Award, Crains Business Cleveland. (2017).
- Fellow, Association of Psychological Science. (2016).
- Most Influential International Thinker, HR Magazine. (2014).
- No.9 Most Influential International Thinker by HR Magazine in 2012 and 2014;
- Named on the 2021 World's Top 2% Scientists list, which includes the most-cited scientists across the length of their career (the ranking is compiled by Stanford University, based on data from Elsevier's Scopus, and published in PLOS Biology Journal; the selection is built from a database of over 100,000 top-scientists that provides standardized information on citations).

== Selected publications ==
Boyatzis has published 10 books and 200 refereed articles in the areas of emotional intelligence, behavior change, competencies and leadership.

- Competent manager: a model for effective performance (1982)
- Innovation in professional education - steps on a journey from teaching to learning: the story of change and invention at the Weatherhead School of Management (1995)
- Transforming qualitative information: thematic analysis and code development (1998)
- Primal leadership: realizing the power of emotional intelligence - with Daniel Goleman and Annie McKee (2002)
- Resonant Leadership: renewing yourself and connecting with others through mindfulness, hope, and compassion (2005)
- Becoming a resonant leader: develop your emotional intelligence, renew your relationships, sustain your effectiveness - with Annie McKee and Frances Johnston (2008)
- Primal Leadership, With a New Preface by the Authors: Unleashing the Power of Emotional Intelligence (2013)
- Helping People Change: Coaching with Compassion for Lifelong Learning and Growth (2019)
- Boyatzis, Richard E. (2024). The science of change: discovering sustained, desired change from individuals to organizations and communities. New York, NY: Oxford University Press. ISBN 978-0-19-776511-1.
