= Raymond Hull (writer) =

Canadian playwright and author

Raymond Hull (27 February 1919 – 7 June 1985) was an England-born Canadian playwright, television screenwriter, and lecturer. He also wrote many non-fiction books, numerous magazine articles, short stories, and poetry. He is best known as the co-author of the book The Peter Principle with Laurence J. Peter. He is also known for the saying "He who trims himself to suit everyone will soon whittle himself away."

He studied creative writing at the University of British Columbia at the age 30 after discovering he had an aptitude for the craft. After graduation, he eventually began writing television screenplays for the Canadian Broadcasting Corporation. He later branched into writing for the stage and in time formed The Gastown Players.

== Biography ==
Hull was born on 27 February 1919 in Shaftesbury, Dorset, England. Following the Second World War, he emigrated to Vancouver and worked as a waiter, janitor and civil servant.

Hull began writing in the late 1950s at 38 years old. In 1983, he published How to Write a Play.

Hull died on 7 June 1985 at St. Paul's Hospital, Vancouver.

== Works ==
=== Plays ===
- The Drunkard (1967)
- Wedded to a Villain (1967)
- Son of the Drunkard (a.k.a. The Drunkard's Revenge, 1982)

=== Books ===
- Profitable Playwriting (1968)
- How To Get What You Want (1969)
- Writing for Money in Canada (1969)
- Effective Public Speaking (1971)
- The Peter Principle (co-author with Laurence Peter)
- Gastown's Gassy Jack (co-author)
- How to Write a Play (1983)
