= Laurence J. Peter =

Canadian educator (1919–1990)

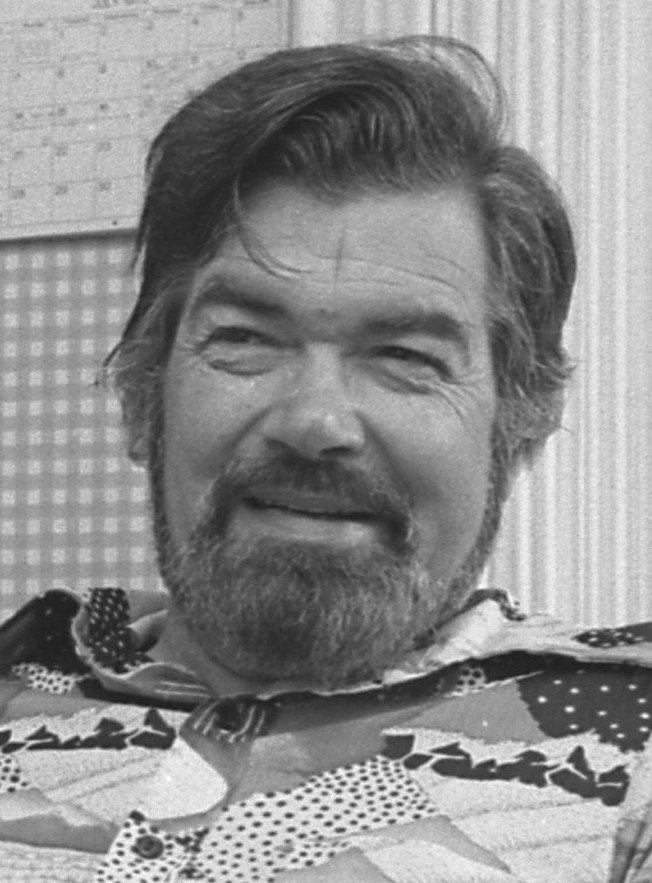
- Peter in 1975
- Born: Laurence Johnston Peter; September 16, 1919; Vancouver, British Columbia, Canada
- Died: January 12, 1990 (aged 70); California, United States
- Education: Western Washington State College
- Occupations: Educator, psychologist, writer
- Known for: Peter principle
- Spouse(s): Nancy M. Peter, Irene Peter
- Children: 4

Laurence Johnston Peter (September 16, 1919 – January 12, 1990) was a Canadian educator and "hierarchiologist" who is best known to the general public for the formulation of the Peter principle.

== Biography ==
Born in Vancouver, British Columbia, Peter was the grandson of William Herbert Steves, the founder of Steveston, British Columbia. Peter began his career as a teacher in Vancouver in 1941, and received the degree of Doctor of Education from Washington State University in Pullman in 1963.

In 1966, Peter moved to California, where he became an Associate Professor of Education, Director of the Evelyn Frieden Centre for Prescriptive Teaching, and Coordinator of Programs for Emotionally Disturbed Children at the University of Southern California (USC) in Los Angeles.

He became widely known in 1969 upon the publication of The Peter Principle – co-authored by Raymond Hull, also from Vancouver – in which he states: "In a hierarchy every employee tends to rise to his level of incompetence... [I]n time every post tends to be occupied by an employee who is incompetent to carry out its duties... Work is accomplished by those employees who have not yet reached their level of incompetence." The Peter principle became one of the most profound principles of management from USC; it is a heavily quoted principle at its Marshall School of Business.

Another notable quotation of his is that the "noblest of all dogs is the hot dog; it feeds the hand that bites it."

From 1985 to his death in 1990, Peter attended and was involved in management of the Kinetic Sculpture Race in Humboldt County, California. He proposed an award for the race titled "The Golden Dinosaur Award", which has been handed out every year since to the first sculptural machine to utterly break down immediately after the start.

At age 70, Peter died of complications from a stroke at his home in Palos Verdes Estates, California.

== Bibliography ==
- Prescriptive Teaching. McGraw-Hill Education. 1965. ISBN 978-0070495753.
- with Raymond Hull (1969). The Peter Principle: Why Things Always Go Wrong. William Morrow and Company. ISBN 978-0061699061.
- The Peter Prescription: How to Make Things Go Right. Bantam Books. 1972. ISBN 978-0553242812.
- Competencies for Teaching: Individual Instruction. Vol. 1. Wadsworth Publishing. 1975.
- Competencies for Teaching: Classroom Instruction. Vol. 2. Wadsworth Publishing. 1975. ISBN 978-0534003876.
- Competencies for Teaching: Therapeutic Instruction. Vol. 3. Wadsworth Publishing. 1975. ISBN 978-0534003883.
- Competencies for Teaching: Teacher Education. Vol. 4. Wadsworth Publishing. 1975. ISBN 0534003893.
- The Peter Plan, A proposal for survival. William Morrow and Company. 1976. ISBN 978-0688029722.
- Peter's Quotations: Ideas for Our Times. Collins Reference. 1977. ISBN 978-0688119096.
- Peter's People. William Morrow and Company. 1979. ISBN 978-0688034887.
- Peter's Almanac. William Morrow and Company. 1982. ISBN 978-0688016128.
- with Bill Dana (1982). The Laughter Prescription. Ballantine Books. ISBN 978-0345353337.
- Why Things Go Wrong or the Peter Principle Revisited. William Morrow and Company. 1984. ISBN 978-0688039028.
- The Peter Pyramid: Or, Will We Ever Get the Point?. William Morrow and Company. 1986. ISBN 978-0688053802.
