= Negative selection (politics) =

Aversion to the success of one's subordinates

Negative selection is a political process that occurs especially in rigid hierarchies, most notably dictatorships, but also to lesser degrees in such settings as corporations or electoral politics.

The person(s) on the top of the hierarchy, wishing to remain in power forever, chooses their associates with the prime criterion of incompetence: they must not be competent enough to remove the leader from power. Since subordinates often mimic their leader, these associates do the same with those below them in the hierarchy, and the hierarchy becomes filled with more and more incompetent people.

If the leader sees that they are threatened nonetheless, they will purge those that threaten them from their positions. They will often first target 'first generation' elites who gained power during the original creation of the regime, since those individuals are more likely to have gained power through ability and charisma rivaling the leader's. Removing those powerful cadres breaks up the networks of loyalty that could threaten the leader. Emptied positions in the hierarchy are normally filled with people from below—those who were less competent than their previous leaders. The hierarchy becomes less and less effective. Once the leader dies, or is removed by an external force, what remains is a grossly ineffective hierarchy.

In a famous anecdote from Herodotus's Histories, a messenger from Periander asks Thrasybulus for advice on ruling. Thrasybulus, instead of responding, takes the messenger for a walk in a field of wheat, where he proceeds to cut off all of the best and tallest ears of wheat. The message, correctly interpreted by Periander, was that a wise ruler would forestall challenges to his rule by "removing" those prominent men who might be powerful enough to challenge him.

== See also ==
- Kakistocracy – Government run by the least qualified
- Mushroom management – Company with dysfunctional communication between managers and employees
- Peter principle – Management concept by Laurence J. Peter
- Tall poppy syndrome – Aversion to the success of one's peers
