= Peter principle =

Management concept by Laurence J. Peter

Cover of Laurence J. Peter's book The Peter Principle

The Peter principle is a concept in management developed by Laurence J. Peter which observes that people in a hierarchy tend to rise to "a level of respective incompetence": employees are promoted based on their success in previous jobs until they reach a level at which they are no longer competent, as skills in one job do not necessarily translate to another.

The concept was explained in the 1969 book The Peter Principle (William Morrow and Company) by Laurence Peter and Raymond Hull. Hull wrote the text, which was based on Peter's research. Peter and Hull intended the book to be satire, but it became popular as it was seen to make a serious point about the shortcomings of how people are promoted within hierarchical organizations. The Peter principle has since been the subject of much commentary and research.

== Summary ==
The Peter principle states that a person who is competent at their job will earn a promotion to a position that requires different skills. If the promoted person lacks the skills required for the new role, they will be incompetent at the new level, and will not be promoted again. If the person is competent in the new role, they will be promoted again and will continue to be promoted until reaching a level at which they are incompetent. Being incompetent, the individual will not qualify for promotion again, and so will remain stuck at this final placement or Peter's plateau.

This outcome is inevitable, given enough time and enough positions in the hierarchy to which competent employees may be promoted. The Peter principle is therefore expressed as: "In a hierarchy, every employee tends to rise to his level of incompetence." This leads to Peter's corollary: "In time, every post tends to be occupied by an employee who is incompetent to carry out its duties." Hull calls the study of how hierarchies work hierarchiology.

== The Peter Principle ==
Laurence J. Peter's research led to the formulation of the Peter Principle well before he published his findings.

Eventually, to elucidate his observations about hierarchies, Peter worked with Raymond Hull to develop a book, The Peter Principle, which was published by William Morrow and Company in 1969. As such, the principle is named for Peter because, although Hull actually wrote almost all of the book's text, it is a summary of Peter's research.

=== Summary ===
In the first two chapters, Peter and Hull give various examples of the Peter principle in action. In each case, the higher position required skills that were not required at the level immediately below. For example, a competent school teacher may make a competent assistant principal, but then go on to be an incompetent principal. The teacher was competent at educating children, and as assistant principal, he was good at dealing with parents and other teachers, but as principal, he was poor at maintaining good relations with the school board and the superintendent.

In chapter 3, Peter and Hull discuss apparent exceptions to this principle and then debunk them. One of these illusory exceptions is when someone who is incompetent is still promoted anyway—they coin the phrase "percussive sublimation" for this phenomenon of being "kicked upstairs" (cf. Dilbert principle). However, it is only a pseudo-promotion: a move from one unproductive position to another. This improves staff morale, as other employees believe that they too can be promoted again. Another pseudo-promotion is the "lateral arabesque": when a person is moved out of the way and given a longer job title.

While incompetence is merely a barrier to further promotion, "super-incompetence" is grounds for dismissal, as is "super-competence". In both cases, "they tend to disrupt the hierarchy." One specific example of a super-competent employee is a teacher of children with special needs: they were so effective at educating the children that, after a year, they exceeded all expectations at reading and arithmetic, but the teacher was still fired because they had neglected to devote enough time to bead-stringing and finger-painting.

Chapters 4 and 5 deal with the two methods of achieving promotion: "push" and "pull". "Push" refers to the employee's own efforts, such as working hard and taking courses for self-improvement. This is usually not very effective due to the seniority factor: the next level up is often fully occupied, blocking the path to promotion. "Pull", on the other hand, is far more effective and refers to accelerated promotion brought about by the efforts of an employee's mentors or patrons.

Chapter 6 explains why "good followers do not become good leaders." In chapter 7, Peter and Hull describe the effect of the Peter principle in politics and government. Chapter 8, titled "Hints and Foreshadowings", discusses the work of earlier writers on the subject of incompetence, such as Sigmund Freud, Karl Marx, and Alexander Pope.

Chapter 9 explains that, once employees have reached their level of incompetence, they always lack insight into their situation. Peter and Hull go on to explain why aptitude tests do not work and are actually counter-productive. Finally, they describe "summit competence": when someone reaches the highest level in their organization and yet is still competent at that level. This is only because there were not enough ranks in the hierarchy, or because they did not have time to reach a level of incompetence. Such people often seek a level of incompetence in another hierarchy; this is known as "compulsive incompetence". For example, Socrates was an outstanding teacher but a terrible defence attorney, and Hitler was an excellent politician but an incompetent generalissimo.

Chapter 10 explains why attempts to assist an incompetent employee by promoting another employee to act as their assistant do not work: "Incompetence plus incompetence equals incompetence" (italics in original).

Chapters 11 and 12 describe the various medical and psychological manifestations of stress that may come as result of someone reaching their level of incompetence, as well as other symptoms such as certain characteristic habits of speech or behaviour.

Chapter 13 considers whether it is possible for an employee who has reached their level of incompetence to be happy and healthy once they get there: the answer is no if the person realizes their true situation, and yes if the person does not.

Various ways of avoiding promotion to the final level are described in chapter 14. Attempting to refuse an offered promotion is ill-advised and is only practicable if the employee is not married and has no one else to answer to. Generally, it is better to avoid being considered for promotion in the first place, by pretending to be incompetent while one is actually still employed at a level of competence. This is "Creative Incompetence", for which several examples of successful techniques are given. It works best if the chosen field of incompetence does not actually impair one's work.

The concluding chapter applies Peter's Principle to the entire human species at an evolutionary level and asks whether humanity can survive in the long run, or will it become extinct upon reaching its level of incompetence as technology advances.

The positive takeaway from The Peter Principle was the self-help advice for a happy existence - to voluntarily, as a life choice, "stay below your level of incompetence".

== Research and related works ==
Other commenters made observations similar to the Peter principle long before Peter's research. Gotthold Ephraim Lessing's 1763 play Minna von Barnhelm features an army sergeant who shuns the opportunity to move up in the ranks, saying "I am a good sergeant; I might easily make a bad captain, and certainly an even worse general. One knows from experience." Similarly, Carl von Clausewitz (1780–1831) wrote that "there is nothing more common than to hear of men losing their energy on being raised to a higher position, to which they do not feel themselves equal." Spanish philosopher José Ortega y Gasset (1883–1955) virtually enunciated the Peter principle in 1910: "All public employees should be demoted to their immediately lower level, as they have been promoted until turning incompetent."

A number of scholars have engaged in research interpreting the Peter principle and its effects. In 2000, Edward Lazear explored two possible explanations for the phenomenon. First is the idea that employees work harder to gain a promotion, and then slack off once it is achieved. The other is that it is a statistical process: workers who are promoted have passed a particular benchmark of productivity based on factors that cannot necessarily be replicated in their new role, leading to a Peter principle situation. Lazear concluded that the former explanation only occurs under particular compensation structures, whereas the latter always holds up.

Alessandro Pluchino, Andrea Rapisarda, and Cesare Garofalo (2010) used an agent-based modelling approach to simulate the promotion of employees in a system where the Peter principle is assumed to be true. They found that the best way to improve efficiency in an enterprise is to promote people randomly, or to shortlist the best and the worst performer in a given group, from which the person to be promoted is then selected randomly. For this work, they won the 2010 edition of the parody Ig Nobel Prize in management science. Later work has shown that firms that are subject to the Peter Principle may be disadvantaged, as they may be overtaken by competitors, or may produce smaller revenues and profits; as well why success most often is a result of luck rather than talent—work which earned Pluchino and Rapisarda a second Ig Nobel Prize in 2022.

In 2018, professors Alan Benson, Danielle Li, and Kelly Shue analyzed sales workers' performance and promotion practices at 214 American businesses to test the veracity of the Peter principle. They found that these companies tended to promote employees to a management position based on their performance in their previous position, rather than based on managerial potential. Consistent with the Peter principle, the researchers found that high-performing sales employees were likelier to be promoted, and that they were likelier to perform poorly as managers, leading to considerable costs to the businesses.

The Peter principle inspired Scott Adams, creator of the comic strip Dilbert, to develop a similar concept, the Dilbert principle. The Dilbert principle holds that incompetent employees are promoted to management positions to get them out of the workflow. The idea was explained by Adams in his 1996 business book The Dilbert Principle, and it has since been analyzed alongside the Peter principle. João Ricardo Faria wrote that the Dilbert principle is "a sub-optimal version of the Peter principle," and leads to even lower profitability than the Peter principle.

Some authors refer to the phenomenon they have observed as the Paula principle: that the Peter principle applies mostly to male employees, while female employees are significantly less likely to be promoted than their male colleagues. Therefore women tend to be kept in positions that are below their abilities. They state that this discrimination against women affects all hierarchical levels and not just top positions. The name is a play on words with those of the apostles Peter and Paul.

== Response by organizations ==
Companies and organizations shaped their policies to contend with the Peter principle. Lazear stated that some companies expect that productivity will "regress to the mean" following promotion in their hiring and promotion practices. Other companies have adopted "up or out" strategies, such as the Cravath System, in which employees who do not advance are periodically fired. The Cravath System was developed at the law firm Cravath, Swaine & Moore, which made a practice of hiring chiefly recent law graduates, promoting internally and firing employees who do not perform at the required level. Brian Christian and Tom Griffiths have suggested the additive increase/multiplicative decrease algorithm as a solution to the Peter principle less severe than firing employees who fail to advance. They propose a dynamic hierarchy in which employees are regularly either promoted or reassigned to a lower level so that any worker who is promoted to their point of failure is soon moved to an area where they are productive.

== Popular recognition ==
The Peter Principle is a British television sitcom broadcast by the BBC between 1995 and 2000, featuring Jim Broadbent as an incompetent bank manager named Peter, in an apparent demonstration of the principle.

The Incompetence Opera is a 16-minute mini-opera that premiered at the satirical Ig Nobel Prize ceremony in 2017, described as "a musical encounter with the Peter principle and the Dunning–Kruger effect".

Freakonomics Radio is an American Public Radio program and podcast. In 2022, an episode was produced entitled "Why Are There So Many Bad Bosses?" This episode explains the Peter Principle and its practicality. The episode aired in syndication on National Public Radio in the United States of America.

== See also ==
- Founder's syndrome – Founder(s) maintaining disproportionate control
- Negative selection (politics) – Aversion to the success of one's subordinates
- Parkinson's law – Adage that work expands to fill its available time
- Putt's Law and the Successful Technocrat – Book
- Responsible position
- Dilbert principle
- Systemantics – Book by John Gall
