= Terryberry =

Private company

- Company type: Private
- Industry: employee recognition
- Founded: 1918; 108 years ago
- Headquarters: Grand Rapids, Michigan, United States
- Services: Employee Recognition Programs and Solutions, Corporate Recognition Programs, Employee Awards, Service Awards, Peer Recognition Platform, Total Recognition Platform

Terryberry is a private, U.S. based company that provides employee recognition and award programs. Founded in 1918 by H. R. Terryberry in Grand Rapids, Michigan, Terryberry's original business focus was producing High School class rings in the Midwestern United States. During the 1970s and early 1980s Terryberry's corporate recognition business began to overtake class rings as the predominant product line. In the early 2000s, Terryberry developed web-based employee recognition solutions in addition to the custom recognition awards. Terryberry continues to be headquartered in Grand Rapids, Michigan and now operates 30 sales offices and has about 25,500 clients in North America, plus an office in the UK.

== Services ==
Today Terryberry provides employee recognition programs, solutions and awards for more than 25,000+ organization of all sizes on six continents. Terryberry specializes in implementing and managing employee recognition and award programs for organizations. Terryberry's manufacturing facility in Grand Rapids designs and manufactures employee awards, service awards, safety awards, corporate rings, watches and lapel pins.

Along with company awards and jewelry, Terryberry offers consulting services to work with clients to establish employee recognition programs in the workplace. Recognition consultants are also available to help companies decide on appropriate company awards. Terryberry conducts employee recognition training through their Recognition University. The training is available on-site and online.

== Corporate Honors ==
In 2006, Terryberry was a regional finalist for the Ernst & Young Entrepreneur of the year program.

In 2008, Terryberry was recognized as Top Recognition Provider by Workforce Management magazine.

In 2016 and 2017, Terryberry was recognized among the Best and Brightest Companies to Work For in the Nation

In 2016 and 2017, Terryberry was recognized among Michigan's 101 Best and Brightest in Wellness.

== Acquisitions ==
In 2008, Terryberry acquired John Gray Awards of Cincinnati. In June 2009, Terryberry acquired Recognize Me! a Kansas-based maker of informal employee recognition kits. Recognize Me! makes day-to-day recognition tools like note cards, certificates and rewards coupons. The venture is expected to increase Terryberry's business by 5 to 10 percent in the next year.

In 2012, Terryberry acquired JMPresentations of the UK.

In 2014, Terryberry acquired The Works GB, a 22-year-old United Kingdom provider of employee rewards and incentives.

In 2014, Terryberry acquired the Stange Company of St. Louis, Missouri.

In 2016, Terryberry announced the acquisition of Kelleher Enterprises of Ann Arbor, Mich., a national specialty recognition incentive company. The move is designed to enhance the global recognition company's offerings and expand its footprint nationally.

In 2017, Terryberry acquired CottrillsReward, a rewards & recognition provider based in the U.K. The company trades under the TerryberryReward banner in the UK and Europe.

== Management ==
Terryberry's current managing partner is Mike Byam. He is a fourth generation managing partner of the company and also the author of The WOW! Workplace.
