= Galau =

Single by Siti Nurhaliza
- Released: 11 January 2013 (Digital); 9 November 2012 (First live performance)
- Recorded: October 2012
- Genre: Pop
- Length: 4:48 (Single); 3:24 (Music video)
- Label: Siti Nurhaliza Production, Universal Music Group (Malaysia)
- Songwriter: Cacaq (Idris Batumena)
- Producer: Cacaq (Idris Batumena)

Siti Nurhaliza singles chronology
"Muara Hati" (2012)	"Galau" (2013)	"Lebih Indah" (2013)

"Galau" (Perplexed) is a single by Malaysian artist Siti Nurhaliza. The song is composed entirely by Cacaq (Idris Batumena), an Indonesian composer. A representative from Rumpun Records (subsidiary of Malaysia's Universal Music Group) met him at East Java to retrieve the song from Cacaq.

First performed live at "Dato' Siti Nurhaliza – Live in Kuantan 2012" concert, it was later released as a digital single on iTunes on 11 January 2013. Its music video, directed by Deryl Adrian Emuang, was released officially on YouTube on 14 May 2013.

In 2013, the song was nominated in the 20th Anugerah Industri Muzik for the category "Best Vocal Performance in a Song (Female)".

== Background and recording ==
"Actually, I really like "Galau" because of its simple song and its easy to memorise lyrics. If a song is easily memorised by the listeners, then it would be easier for it to be accepted by the mass."

— Siti Nurhaliza on recording "Galau" (Note: Original:"Sebenarnya saya sukakan lagu Galau kerana lagunya ringkas dan liriknya mudah diingati. Jika lagu itu senang dihafal pendengar, mudahlah ia diterima ramai.")

The song began as a demo by its original songwriter and producer, Cacaq (Idris Batumena). The demo was given to Mujahid, a representative from Rumpun Records (subsidiary of Malaysia's Universal Music Group) who personally met Cacaq in 2008 in East Java. To retrieve the demo, Mujahid had to travel at a distance of more than 2,500 kilometres (1,600 mi), from Surabaya to Genteng Wetan, East Java.

In October 2012, the song was finally given to Siti as part of an agreement between Siti Nurhaliza Productions and Universal Music Group (Malaysia).

== Composition and lyrics ==
A moderate pop song, the songs lasts for four minutes and forty eight seconds. Galau which can be translated as a state of worry or confusion, is a song that revolves around the hardships that two lovers have to face when their love lives are full of obstacles.

== Release and promotion ==
Prior to its official digital single release on 11 January 2013, the song was first performed two months earlier, on 8 November 2012 in front of the audience of "Dato' Siti Nurhaliza – Live in Kuantan 2012" concert. After the single was slated for its digital release on 11 January 2013, the song was promoted to three major radio stations in Malaysia, Era FM, Hot FM and Suria FM on 18 January 2013.

== Reception ==
Within a week after the release of the single, Siti was listed in the Top 10 of most searched entries on Google Malaysia for week running from 18 to 24 January.

== Music video ==
=== Background ===
Recorded on 7 December 2012, the music video was directed by Daryl Adrian Emuang and shot at Moroccan Pavilion, Putrajaya Botanical Garden, Putrajaya. According to Daryl, the location was chosen for its unique and beautiful architecture. Apart from scenes involving Siti, Daryl also employed a pair of aerial dancers to better visualise his experimental abstract take on the music video. The music video was launched and previewed at a special press conference to promote the music video that took place at Kuala Lumpur Tower on 13 May 2013, before officially being released for public viewing on Rumpun Records' official YouTube account on the next day.

=== Synopsis ===
The music video begins with the scene showing Siti sauntering down the hallway with heavily decorated arch and pillars around her. In the next scene, she is shown sitting on top of a brown coloured velvet sofa. Throughout her scenes, she only wears a single ensemble – soft pink dress and a matching pink headpiece. In other scenes, clips of male and female aerial dancers in an entire black ensemble twirling and winding up and down on white fabrics interspersed between scenes involving Siti. Clips that involve the dancers begin with a female dancer only shot, to a male dancer only shot, before halfway through the music video, the dancers are finally shot dancing together in a single frame shot. In most of the scenes that involve the dancers, they are also mirror effects and kaleidoscope effects that are applied on their shots as they wind up and down their dancing fabrics. The same effects are also applied on Arabic scripts that are shown behind the dancers. Throughout the video, the scenes that are depicting Siti vary in term of distance, from long shot, medium shot to close-up.

The entire length of its music video is significantly shorter than the single itself, with a whole duration of three minutes and twenty four seconds.

== Live performances ==
Apart from its first performance at "Dato' Siti Nurhaliza – Live in Kuantan 2012" concert, the song was also performed at Siti's Secretaries' Week performance on 11 April 2013 at Taming Sari Ballroom, The Royale Chulan, Kuala Lumpur. She also performed the song for a special television program, "Stailista Unplugged", that was aired during the 2013 Eid al-Fitr week. For the show, "Galau" was rendered specially to fit with the unplugged theme.

== Cover versions ==
On 7 September 2013, a Singaporean contestant of Akademi Fantasia 2013 (where Siti is also one of the mentors), Nur Aishah Abdul Aziz covered the song during the Top 12 Prelude Concert. In May 2014, the song was covered by Malaysian electric violinist, Dennis Lau, in his album, A Malaysian Journey.

== Credits and personnel ==
- Cacaq – producer, songwriter
- Firdaus Mahmud – music arrangement
- Ismael Arafat – mix engineer
- Kelly – bass
- Man Kidal – guitar
- Mujahid Abd Wahab – executive producer
- Mohariz Yaakub – vocals producer
- Saunine Strings – strings
- Siti Nurhaliza – vocals
- Ujang – drums

== Awards ==
=== Anugerah Industri Muzik ===
Year	Nominee / work	Award	Result
2013	Galau	Best Vocal Performance in a Song (Female)	Nominated

=== Anugerah Meletop ERA ===
Year	Nominee / work	Award	Result
2013	Galau	Lagu Meletop (Most 'Happening' Song)	Nominated

== Format and track listing ==
- Digital download
1. "Galau" – 4:48

== Radio and release history ==
Country	Date	Format	Label
Malaysia	11 January 2012	Digital download	Siti Nurhaliza Productions, Universal Music Group (Malaysia)
Malaysia	18 January 2013	Contemporary hit radio	Siti Nurhaliza Productions, Universal Music Group (Malaysia)
