= The Feiner Points of Leadership =

2004 book by Michael Feiner

The Feiner Points of Leadership: The 50 Basic Laws That Will Make People Want to Perform Better for You
- Author: Michael Feiner
- Language: English
- Genre: Business, Management, Leadership
- Publisher: Warner Business Books; First Edition (June 14, 2004)
- Publication date: 2004
- Publication place: United States
- Media type: Print (Hardcover, Paperback), E-book
- Pages: 286
- ISBN: 0446532762

The Feiner Points of Leadership: The 50 Basic Laws That Will Make People Want to Perform Better for You, first published in 2004, is a book written by Michael Feiner, the former Vice President and Chief People Officer at Pepsi-Cola and former professor of Columbia Graduate School of Business. It presents 50 laws for managing business problems based on the author's experiences. The book explores how leaders can positively influence their teams, foster collaboration, and build a productive, motivated work environment. Feiner's approach is based on the idea that leadership is not just about managing tasks but about inspiring and empowering others to achieve their best potential.

It was selected by the Toronto Globe and Mail as the Best Business Book of 2004.
