= Secretary =

Office occupation supporting management

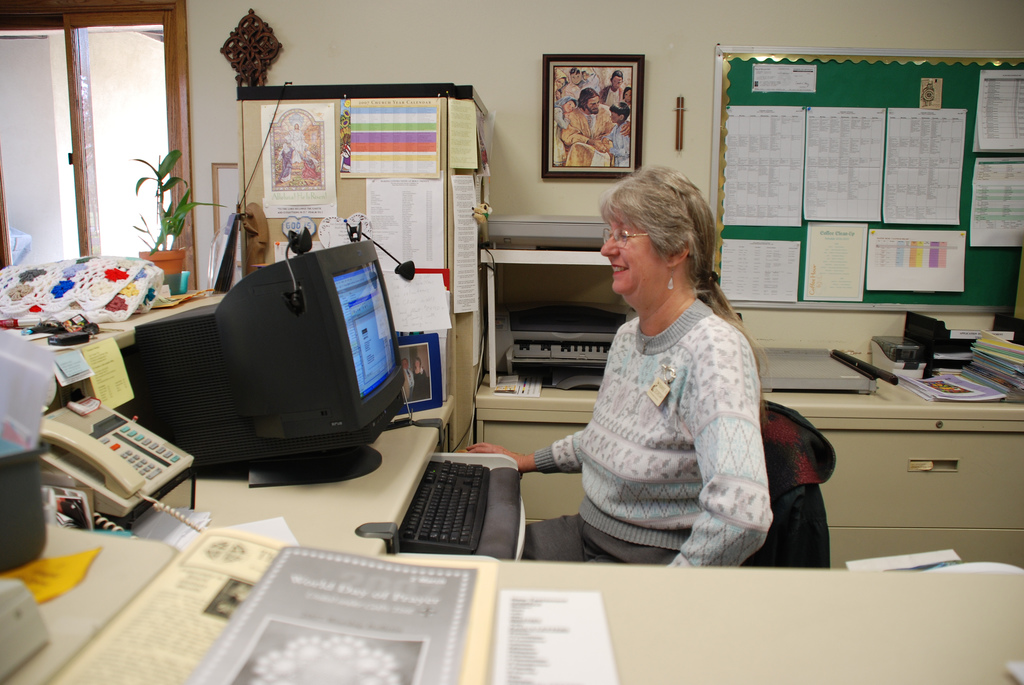
A secretary working at the Holy Trinity Lutheran Church in California, 2007

A secretary, increasingly called an administrative assistant or administrative professional in the United States, is a person who provides office and administrative support to a business or organization. They often deal with correspondence, scheduling, record-keeping, and general office administration.

In modern workplaces, the role often includes more responsibility than in the past. Secretaries may assist with project management, business administration, document preparation, and other operational tasks. Some positions require specialized knowledge, a university degree, or formal training, especially in larger organizations.

Titles vary depending on duties and seniority. An executive assistant works directly with a senior executive. A personal assistant may help with both professional and personal matters. In some organizations, the most senior administrative staff member may be called an office manager or chief of staff.

== Duties and functions ==
A secretary or administrative professional also known as a personal assistant (PA), program assistant, or administrative assistant, can have many administrative duties. The title "secretary" is not used as often today as in decades past, and responsibilities have evolved in response to the technological age, requiring knowledge in software. The duties may vary according to the nature and size of the company or organization, and in the most generic or original sense, might include managing budgets, bookkeeping, attending telephone calls, handling visitors, maintaining websites, travel arrangements, event planning, mailroom operations, and preparing expense reports. Secretaries might also manage all the administrative details of running a high-level conference or meeting and be responsible for arranging the catering for a lunch meeting. Often executives will ask their assistant to take the minutes at meetings and prepare meeting documents for review. In addition to the minutes, the secretary may be responsible for keeping all of the official records of a company or organization. A senior level secretary is also regarded as an "office manager". There is a diverse array of work experiences attainable within the administrative support field, in multiple sectors such as the private sector, public sector, and voluntary sector, ranging between internship, entry-level, associate, junior, mid-senior, and senior level pay bands with positions in nearly every industry, especially among white-collar careers and to a lesser extent among grey-collar jobs. Their work contributions are celebrated on Administrative Professionals Day.

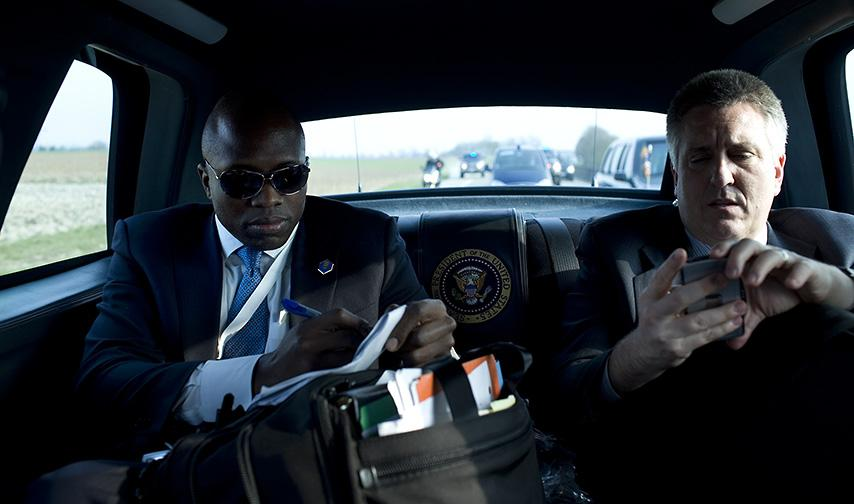
Reggie Love (left), who served as U.S. President Barack Obama's Personal Aide

Many secretaries, administrative assistants, and program assistants are considered part of the professional services, unlike the prior secretaries who were categorized under the low-skilled and unskilled labor force. Today, they conduct research, briefings, write memoranda, conduct copyediting/copywriting (content writing) duties, handle project management, program evaluation, stakeholder management, office management, mailroom operations, property management, receptionist, customer service duties, devise and maintain office systems including records management, data management, and filing; carry out background research and present findings; produce documents like white papers and gray literature, carry out specific projects; take on some of the manager's responsibilities; get involved in decision-making processes; handle communications, press, and public relations tasks; or logistics and procurement, along with a wide range of other duties related to their specific industry. Secretaries in some fields may be required to have extensive professional knowledge. Accordingly, duties for these assistants may be more specialized.

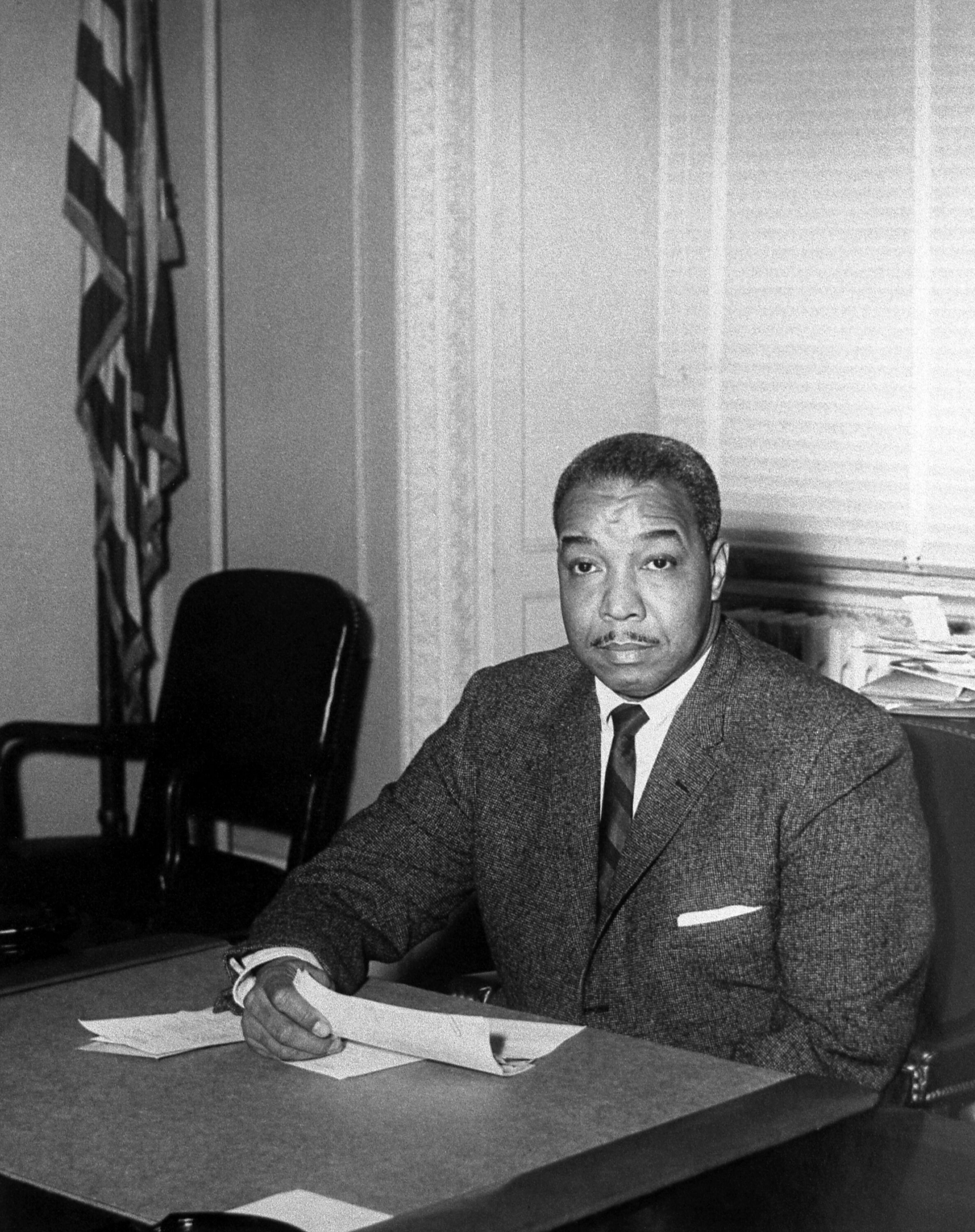
Frank D. Reeves, who served as Special Assistant to the President under U.S. President John F. Kennedy

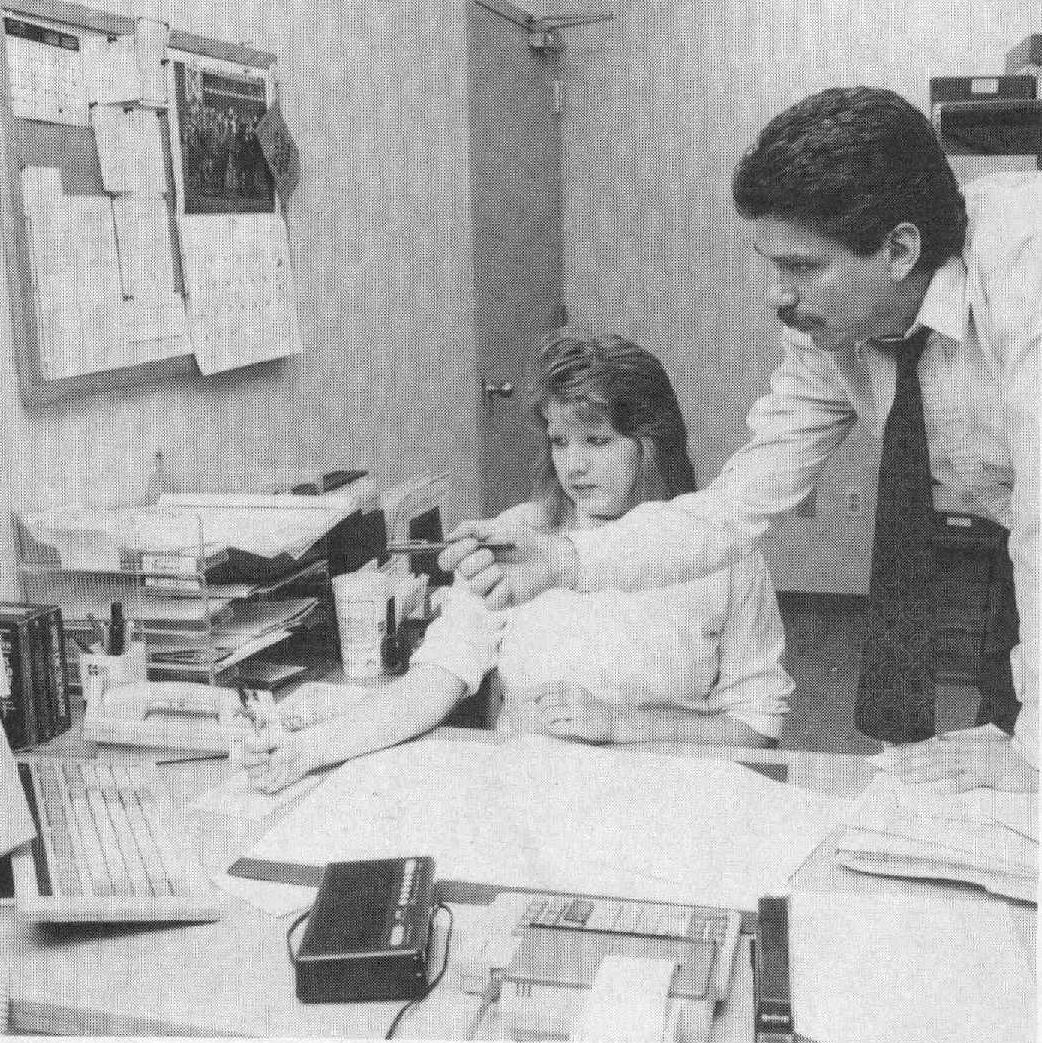
Clerical office supervisor and employee at work (1992)

In a place of employment, many job descriptions and job titles overlap. However, while administrative assistant is a generic term, not necessarily implying directly working for a superior, a secretary in most cases is usually the key person for all administrative tasks, and often referred to as the "gate keeper". Other titles describing jobs similar to or overlapping those of the traditional secretary, most especially at mid-career or senior level roles, are Office Coordinator, Executive Assistant, Special Assistant, and generically as Administrative Professional, with the titles of Office Manager and Chief of staff being used for the most senior administrative professional with managerial authority, depending on the company's organizational chart.

This should be distinguished from the Company secretary, a senior role within a company responsible for compliance with statutory and regulatory requirements; it should also be distinguished from the title Secretary (title) as used by cabinet members of a government as well as senior or executive leadership in political parties. In other situations, a secretary is an officer of a society or organization who deals with correspondence, admits new members, and organizes official meetings and events.

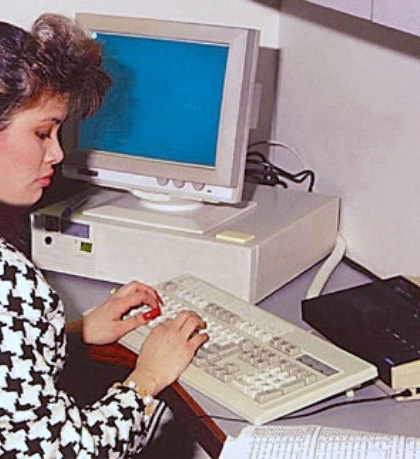
A data entry clerk

In previous decades, especially in the 20th century and before, at the most basic level a secretary was usually an audio typist, amanuensis, and gofer, with a small number of administrative roles. A good command of the prevailing office language and the ability to type is essential. At higher grades and with more experience they begin to take on additional roles and spend more of their time maintaining physical and electronic files, being a data entry clerk, dealing with the post, photocopying, emailing clients, ordering stationery and answering telephones. A more skilled executive assistant may be required to type at high speeds using technical or foreign languages, organize diaries, itineraries and meetings and carry out administrative duties which may include accountancy or financial accounting. A secretary / executive assistant may also control access to a manager, thus becoming an influential and trusted aide. Executive assistants are available for contact during off hours by new electronic communication methods for consultations.

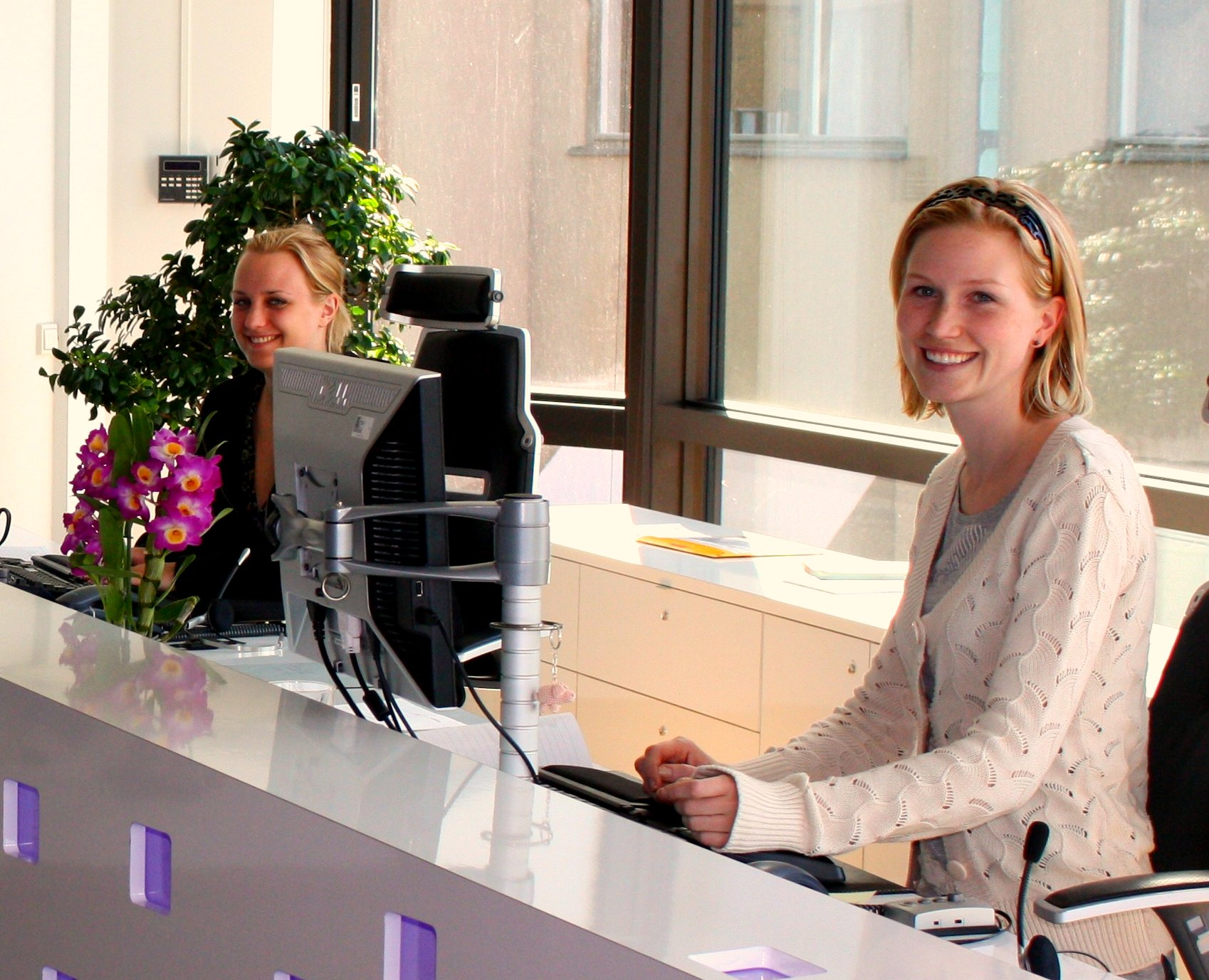
Receptionist of EA DICE in Stockholm, Sweden

The work of a receptionist or front desk assistant is usually performed in a waiting area such as a lobby or front office desk of an organization or business; the title is attributed to the person who is employed by an organization to receive or greet any visitors, patients, or clients and answer telephone calls..

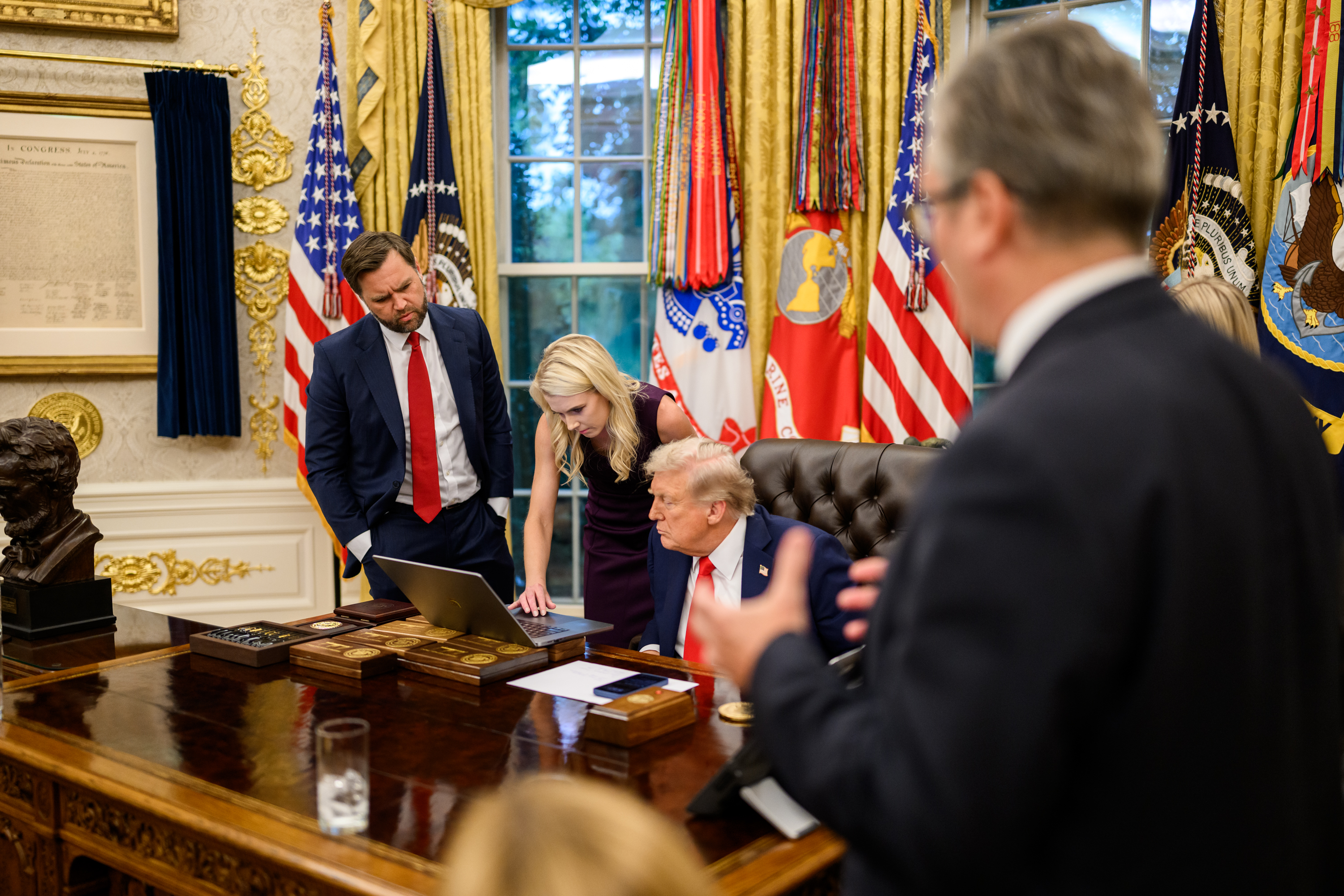
Natalie Harp (second from the left), who served as Executive Assistant to the President of the United States (a title formerly known as Secretary to the President of the United States) under U.S. President Donald Trump, holds a bachelor's degree from Point Loma Nazarene University and a Master of Business Administration (MBA) from Liberty University.

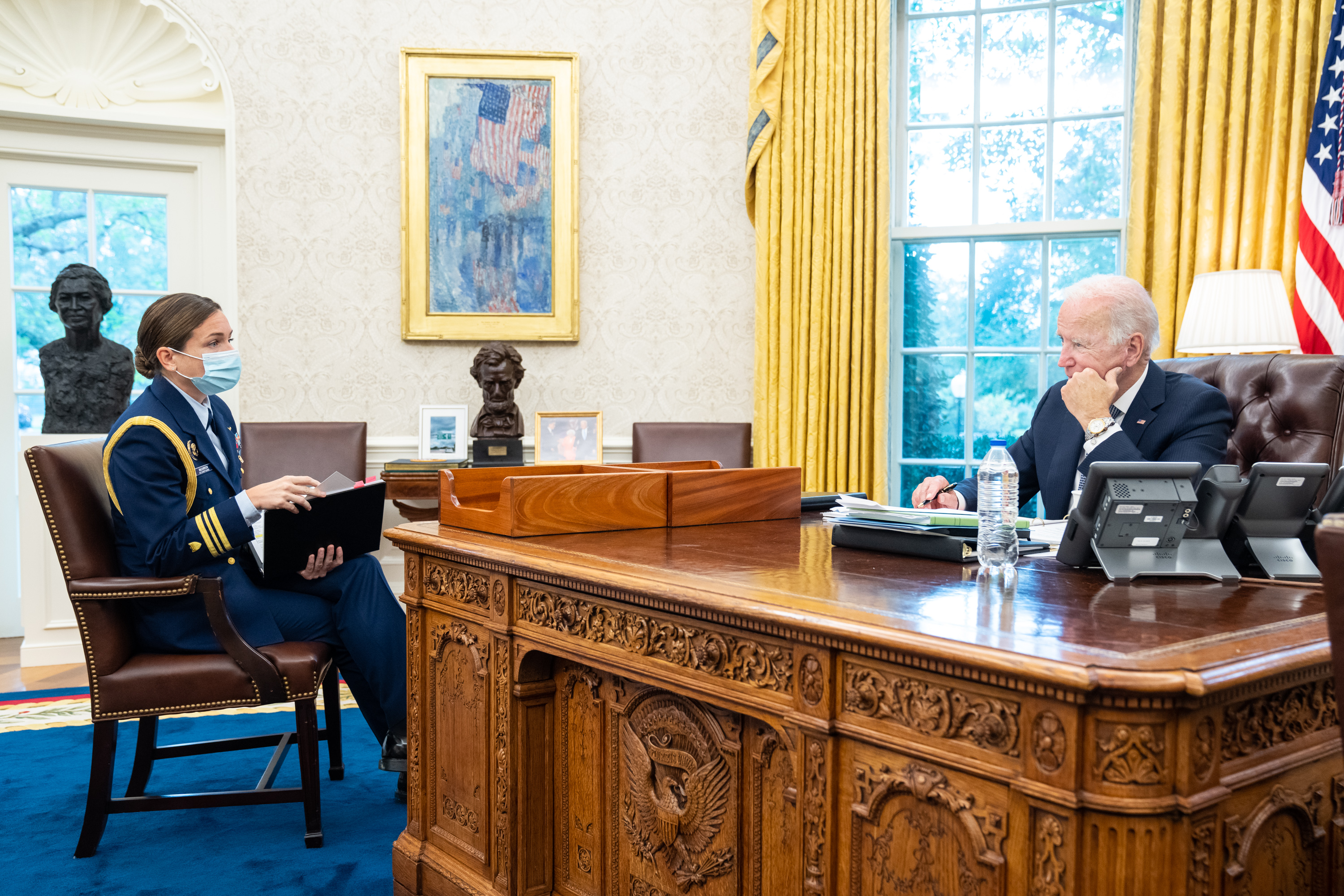
United States Coast Guard military aid Lieutenant Commander Jayna McCarron (left), serving as part of the White House Military Office, with President Joe Biden in the Oval Office

== Education, training, and entering the profession ==
=== 21st century ===
In the United States, a variety of skills and adaptability to new situations is necessary. As such, a four-year bachelor's degree is often preferred and a two-year associate degree is usually a requirement, in any field of study unless specified by employers to comply with education requirements within their given industry, although work experience can substitute education if the position does not require specialized knowledge in a specific field of study pertinent to the employer's industry or division's role within the organization. Another option taken with or without higher education is to get a professional certification from a national association that self-regulates the secretarial and administrative assistance industry, in which a professional certification may substitute higher education if the person does not have a bachelor's degree or an associate degree, or to substitute work experience for a person with a higher education degree but with limited experience in an administrative support role.

=== 19th–20th centuries ===
During the 20th Century among Baby boomers, some older Gen X adults, and previous generations it was common for secretaries to enter the profession only having obtained a high school diploma supplemented by on-the-job training with no formal post-secondary education, a higher education degree, or previous professional service experience, unlike successor generations in the 21st century.

The entry requirements for the profession of secretary in the 19th and 20th centuries were low: having shorthand and typing skills were the only skills required for the position. After finishing high school or after reaching the allowed age for workforce entry, if needed it was possible take courses lasting several weeks, to learn how to write shorthand and typing, which advanced entry into a shorthand or writing pool secretary position; these schools or private schools offering courses in typing, for example, existed as early as the 1880s.

== Origin ==
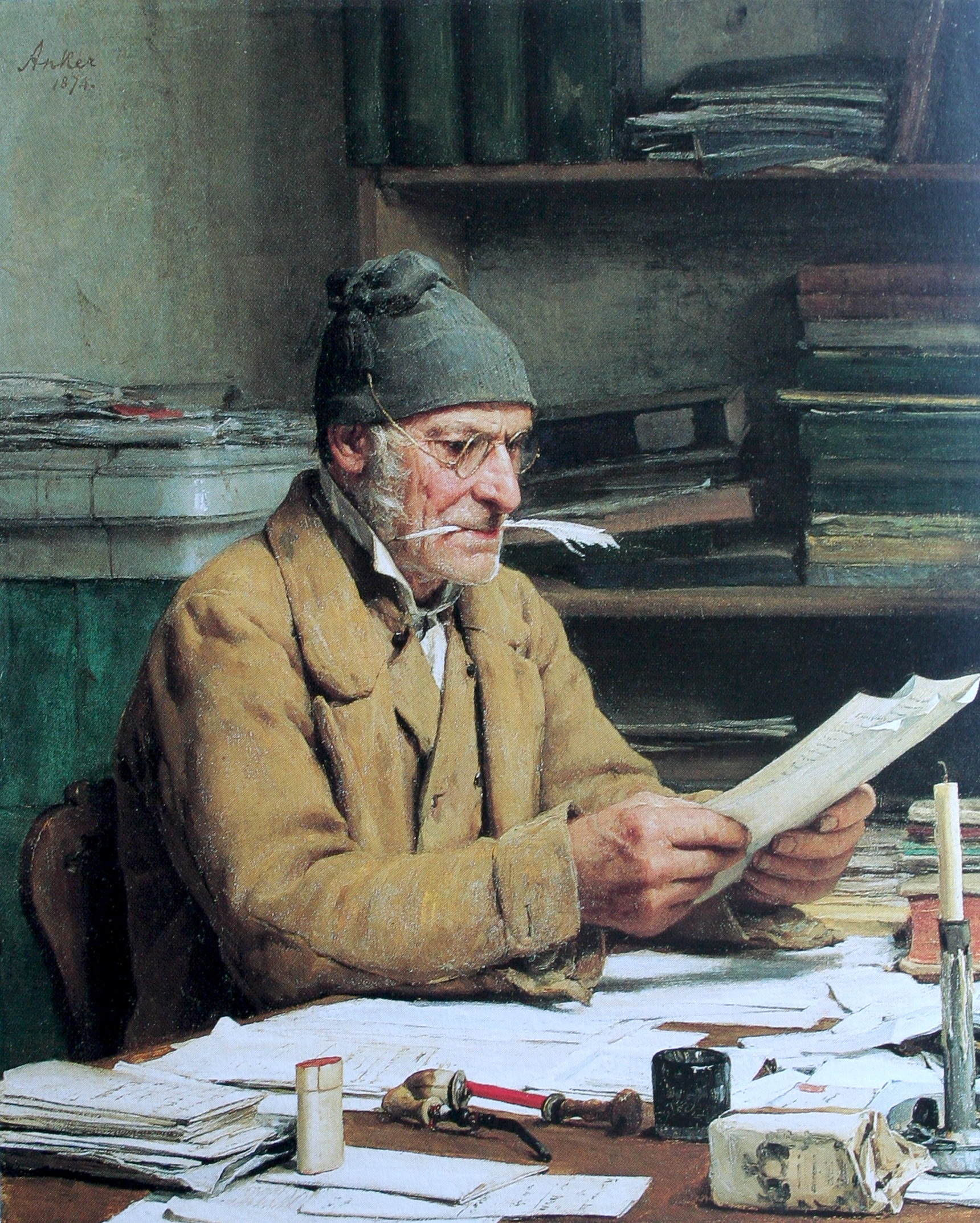
Der Gemeindeschreiber (the town clerk), painting by Albert Anker, 1874

From the Renaissance until the late 19th century, men involved in the daily correspondence and the activities of the powerful had assumed the title of secretary. With time, like many titles, the term was applied to more and varied functions, leading to compound titles to specify various secretarial work better, like general secretary or financial secretary. Just "secretary" remained in use either as an abbreviation when clear in the context or for relatively modest positions such as administrative assistant of the officer(s) in charge, either individually or as member of a secretariat. As such less influential posts became more feminine and common with the multiplication of bureaucracies in the public and private sectors, new words were also coined to describe them, such as personal assistant.

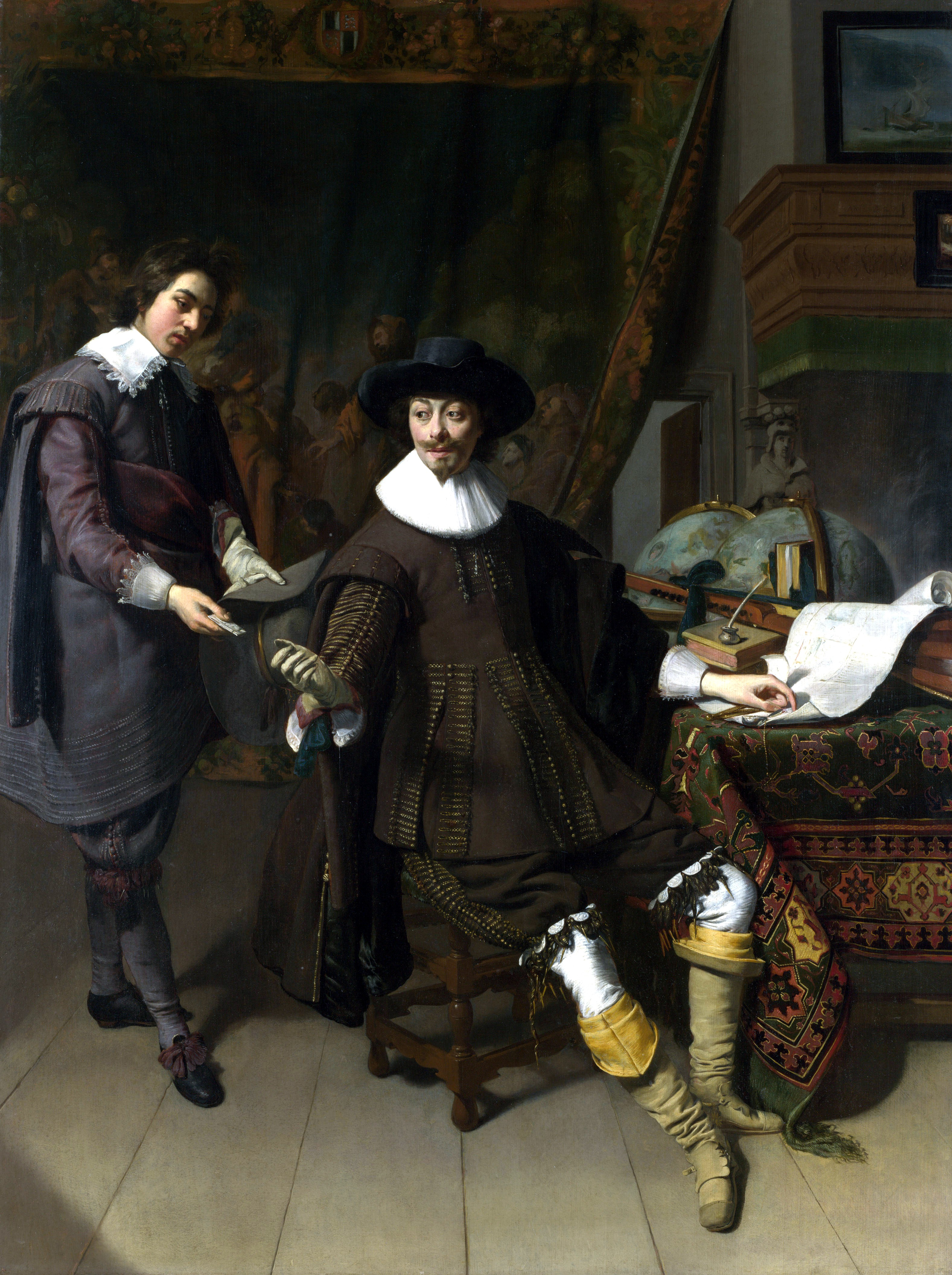
Thomas de Keyser, Portrait of Constantijn Huygens with his Secretary, 1627

In the 1840s and 1850s, commercial schools were emerging to train male and female students the skills needed to work in a clerical position. In 1870, Sir Isaac Pitman founded a school where students could qualify as shorthand writers to "professional and commercial men". Originally, this school was only for male students. In 1871, there were more than 150 such schools operating in the United States, a number that grew to as many as 500 by the 1890s.

In the 1880s, with the invention of the typewriter, more women began to enter the field and during the upcoming years, especially since World War I, the role of secretary has been primarily associated with women. By the 1930s, fewer men were entering the field of secretaries. In an effort to promote professionalism among United States secretaries, the National Secretaries Association was created in 1942. Today, this organization is known as the International Association of Administrative Professionals (IAAP). The organization developed the first standardized test for office workers called the Certified Professional Secretaries Examination (CPS). It was first administered in 1951.

By the mid-20th century, the need for secretaries was great and offices and organizations featured large secretarial pools. In some cases the demand was great enough to spur secretaries being recruited from overseas; in particular, there was often a steady demand for young British women to come to the U.S. and fill temporary or permanent secretarial positions. Several organizations were created to assist secretaries from foreign lands, including the Society of International Secretaries and the Association of British Secretaries in America.

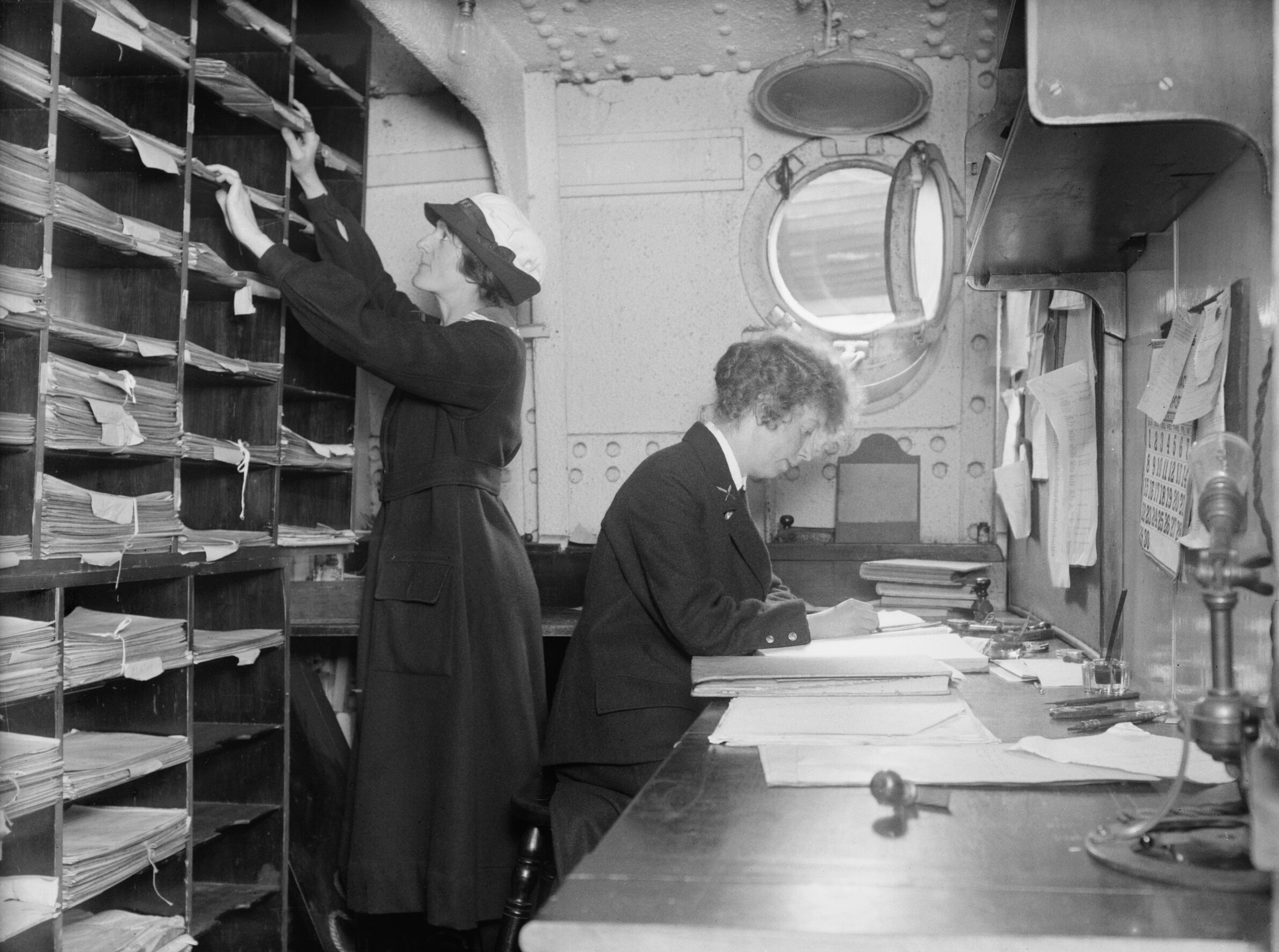
Two Women's Royal Naval Service clerks aboard HMS Essex during World War I

In 1952, Mary Barrett, president of the National Secretaries Association, C. King Woodbridge, president of Dictaphone Corporation, and American businessman Harry F. Klemfuss created a special Secretary's Day holiday, to recognize the hard work of the staff in the office. The holiday caught on, and during the fourth week of April is now celebrated in offices all over the world.

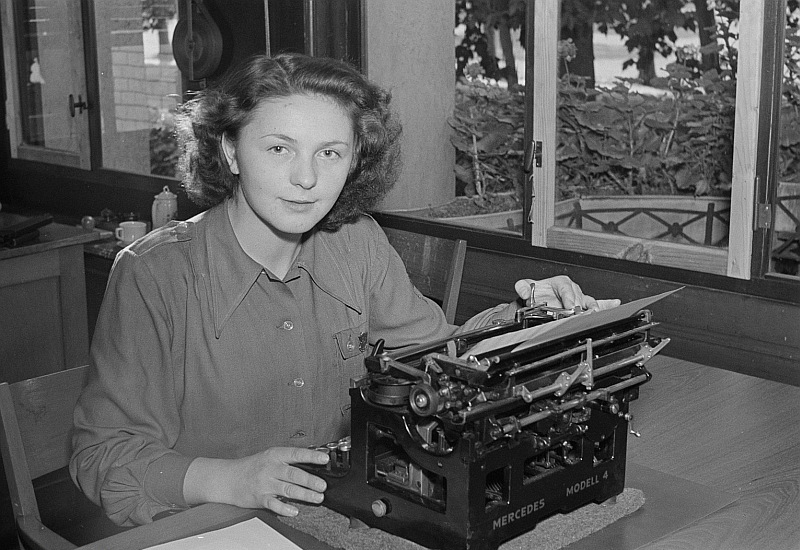
Secretary typist in 1951

In the 20th century, with the spread of the typewriter, shorthand saw competition from steno-typing. Typing thus became the prerogative of women, widows or relatively well-educated young girls, originally from the middle class or the petty bourgeoisie, then from working-class backgrounds with the rise of the profession between the two world wars, which saw the women seize these innovations. Working in the mailroom as a mail clerk, mailroom clerk, shipping and receiving clerk, or in dated parlance, mailboy, was a stereotypical male gender oriented entry-level job in an organization, and working one's way up the corporate ladder "from the mailroom" is a common idiom.

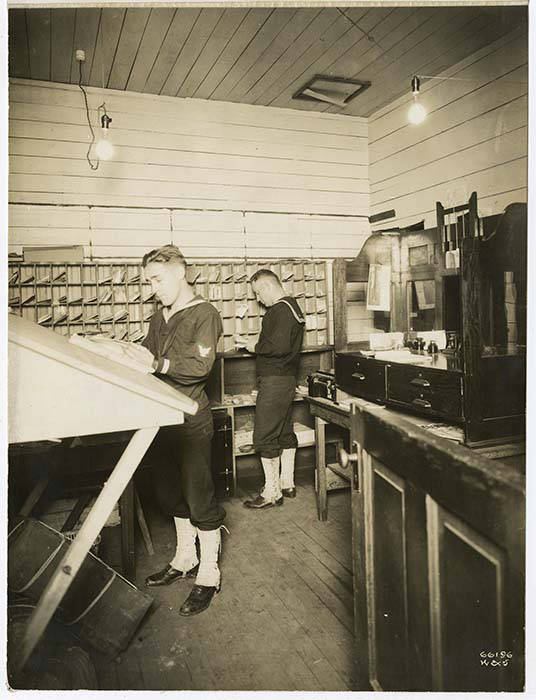
Mail Clerks and Mailboys working in a Mailroom at Naval Station Puget Sound- Naval Training Station, Seattle, Washington (United States) circa 1918

Secretary's Day was later renamed and expanded into Administrative Professional's Week to highlight the increased responsibility of today's secretary and other administrative workers in the professional service, and to avoid embarrassment to those who believe that "secretary" refers only to women or to unskilled workers as was typical in the 20th Century.

Until recent years, the profession of secretary in the original sense was often subject, in the collective imagination, to stereotypes and pejorative connotations. Indeed, secretarial work was easily associated with low-value, thankless, and badly paid tasks, such as serving coffee to superiors, making photocopies or filing menial documents. In addition, most of the profession was once exercised almost exclusively by women as a pink-collar job where in some societies a practitioner of this field was referred to as an office lady, except for certain roles like mailboy or mail clerk which were more so exercised by men as a grey-collar job – or in some cases a blue-collar job -, with both once being considered part of the unskilled labor force in previous decades, but in the 21st century many employers began re-classifying many professional service entry-level white-collar jobs, including ones historically held by men in decades past, as secretary, administrative assistant, mail clerk, file clerk, or program assistant roles. Employers have long preferred unmarried women, a notion that resonated with governments and unions when jobs were scarce in tough economic times. During the 1930s in the United States, both a number of states and the federal government attempted to legislate married women out of the labor market, finding support from unions promoting "family wages"—a wage equal to a married woman husband had enough income to support both a household chore wife and a flock of children. The job of office lady in Japan, and to a certain extent Mainland China, Taiwan and Hong Kong, to this day refers to an office worker in Japan, always female, who performs generally pink-collar tasks such as old-school secretarial or clerical work, in a full-time permanent staff capacity, with relatively little opportunity for promotion, and in most cases a tacit expectation that they leave their jobs once they get married. In the United States, all legislative initiatives that wanted to create a legal basis for such discrimination ultimately failed. But even without a legal basis, employers tried to exclude married women from employment. In a 1940 survey, 40 percent of 485 US companies surveyed said they had clear policies barring married women from working for them. The reason given was that married women would soon leave their positions anyway, and if they stayed in their positions, because of their domestic and family responsibilities, they would not give their paid work the attention that an unmarried woman would. Many of the women working in the office therefore lied about their marital status. Until the mid-1970s, when women's career opportunities began to expand, shorthand and typing skills offered them the chance to find a job with those skills, even if they had completed education that would have given them other jobs had it not been for gender discrimination.

=== Etymology ===
The term is derived from the Latin word secernere, "to distinguish" or "to set apart", the passive participle (secretum) meaning "having been set apart", with the eventual connotation of something private or confidential, as with the English word secret. A secretarius was a person, therefore, overseeing business confidentially, usually for a powerful individual (a king, pope, etc.). As the duties of a modern secretary often still include the handling of confidential information, the literal meaning of their title still holds true.

== See also ==
- Clerk
- Cabinet secretary or Department secretary
- Office lady
- Receptionist
