= Distinguished professor =

Academic title

Distinguished Professor is a prestigious academic title conferred upon a small number of exceptional tenured professors in universities, schools, or departments; primarily in Anglo-American and Commonwealth countries.

Recipients of this honour are often academics who have demonstrated "exceptional scholarly achievement", have attained "international eminence within their respective fields of study", and/or who are especially noted for the "transformative nature of their contributions to the advancement of knowledge". Some distinguished professors may have endowed chairs, or receive an incremental stipend additional to their base salary.

Commonly specific to its issuing institution, "distinguished professor" is one of the highest seniority titles in academia – second only to bespoke titles such as "president's professor", "university professor", "distinguished research professor", "distinguished teaching professor", "distinguished university professor", "university distinguished professor", "distinguished chair professor" or "regents professor". (Some institutions grant university-specific formal titles for their most senior tier of recognition; such as M.I.T.'s "Institute Professor", Yale University's "Sterling Professor", or Duke University's "James B. Duke Professor".) Regardless of such variance, both categories of honorific are granted exclusively to a small percentage of the top tenured faculty who are regarded as particularly important in their respective fields of research.

Certain academic and/or scholarly organizations may also bestow the title of "distinguished professor" in recognition of achievement over the course of an academic career (rather than for a specific discovery or isolated instance of pioneering research). For example, the Association of Collegiate Schools of Architecture annually recognizes up to five faculty members at architecture schools in the United States and Canada with the ACSA Distinguished Professor Award.

The relative rarity of distinguished professors within academia is due in part to universities imposing discretionary restrictions; limiting the volume of candidate nominations that will be accepted, or even capping distinguished professor positions at a fixed percentage of the total faculty workforce.
