= EVP =

EVP may refer to:

== Political parties ==
- Estonian Left Party (Estonian: Eesti Vasakpartei)
- European People's Party (German: Europäische Volkspartei)
- Evangelical People's Party (Netherlands) (Dutch: Evangelische Volkspartij), defunct
- Evangelical People's Party of Switzerland (German: Evangelische Volkspartei der Schweiz)

== Other uses ==
- Earned Value Professional, a designation for cost engineers created by AACE International
- Eigen value problem
- Electronic voice phenomenon
- Employee value proposition
- Employee volunteering programme; see Volunteering § Corporate volunteering
- Enhanced Virus Protection, of AMD processors
- Evoked visual potential
- Executive Vice President
