= Universum (company) =

Global research and advisory company

- Industry: Research, consulting
- Founded: 1988
- Founder: Lars-Henrik Molin
- Headquarters: Stockholm, Sweden
- Parent: Stepstone
- Website: https://universumglobal.com

Universum is a global research and advisory company specializing in employer branding. Part of the StepStone Group and Axel Springer family, the company headquarters is located in Stockholm, Sweden.

Universum surveys annually over 1 million students and professionals worldwide to determine what they expect from employers.

== History ==
Universum was founded in 1988 in Stockholm, Sweden by Lars-Henrik Friis Molin who attended the Stockholm School of Economics.

In 1994, Universum launched the European Student Barometer. They founded the US Student Barometer in 1996, and the Asian Student Barometer in 1999.

In 2005, the company started consulting on Employer value proposition and the next year acquired the career website WetFeet, founded in 1994.

In 2009, it launched the World's Most Attractive Employers and in 2011, it acquired the career networking platform Doostang.

In 2015, Universum's surveys attracted more than 1 million respondents worldwide.

In May 2018, Universum was acquired by StepStone Group and Axel Springer Company for approximately SEK 500 million according to Dagens industri business newspaper.

In 2020, the company became a corporate member of ESOMAR.
