= Prices and Incomes Accord =

Labour union agreements in Australia

The Prices and Incomes Accord (also known as The Accord, the ALP–ACTU Accord, or ACTU–Labor Accord) was a series of agreements between the Australian Labor Party (ALP) and the Australian Council of Trade Unions (ACTU), in effect from 1983 to 1996. Central to these agreements was an incomes policy to address the stagflation crisis by restraining wages. The unions agreed to limit their wage demands and assist in microeconomic reforms, and in exchange, the government provided a 'social wage' of welfare and tax cuts.

The Accord brought major changes to the Australian economy and continued throughout the entire period of the Hawke–Keating government. Two major outcomes were the reintroduction of universal public healthcare and the extension of superannuation coverage. The economic outcomes are difficult to gauge, but economic growth and inflation improved over this time period while trade union membership declined.

== Background ==
The Accord arose in the context of the stagflation crisis — simultaneous high inflation and low growth, as well as high unemployment. To address this crisis, many countries had imposed wage freezes including Britain (the Social Contract), New Zealand, France, and the Netherlands.

In Australia, the Fraser government had imposed a wage freeze with the goal of lowering inflation and increasing international competitiveness; however, it was ineffective due to trade union resistance.

== Stages of the Accord ==
The Accord progressed through seven stages in which it was revised significantly.

=== Original Accord (1983) ===
The first Accord was implemented after Bob Hawke was elected to power in March 1983, but was the product of a long series of prior negotiations between the ALP and ACTU.

To commence the Accord, a National Economic Summit was convened between federal and state governments, unions, and businesses. This was important in securing the business community's support for the reintroduction of centralised wage fixing, by endorsing it as a mechanism of wage restraint.

The first Accord was broad in scope, covering wages, prices, non-wage remuneration, taxation, and government expenditure. It aimed to provide a "social wage" in lieu of wage rises. Some of its key outcomes included the following.

- Full wage indexation to the Consumer Price Index (CPI), meaning that wages were fixed to the cost of living.
- Unions committed to make "no extra claims" above or outside this wages policy.
- The reintroduction of universal public healthcare (under the name Medicare).
- The establishment of the Prices Surveillance Authority which monitored prices in the economy (but did not have the ability to control prices).
- The establishment of tripartite councils (between government, unions, and business) including the Economic Planning and Advisory Council and several industry councils. These bodies were for consultation in government decision-making.
- Tax cuts for low- and middle-income earners.
- The introduction of a National Occupational Health and Safety Commission.

Additionally, other outcomes of the Accord's first three years include the following: increases to family payments; improvements to childcare; introducing various tax avoidance measures; increased pensions; increased unemployment benefits; and, cuts to the top personal income tax rate from 60 cents to 47 cents on the dollar.

=== Accord Mark II (1985) ===
Two years into the Accord, a falling Australian dollar made imports more expensive, hence adding to inflation. Under the terms of the original Accord, wages would be raised in proportion to the inflated price of consumer goods. The government saw a break with wage indexation as a way to stem the inflation. Also, they saw the devalued dollar as an opportunity to improve the country's trade deficit as long as they could prevent labour costs from rising.

Negotiations were made and a second edition of the Accord was established in September 1985. In this agreement, wages were discounted 2% below the index in exchange for personal income tax cuts and a 3% superannuation contribution. This wage-tax-superannuation deal purported to keep real wages consistent while lowering labour costs in the economy.

=== Accord Mark III (1987) ===
The third edition of the Accord, established in March 1987, marked the end of formal wage indexation and the introduction of a two-tiered system. The first tier was a general wage increase of $10 per week and the second tier was an increase of up to 4%, conditional on implementing certain efficiency improvements. This agreement represented a significant shift away from determining wages based on the cost of living and towards determining them based on productivity.

=== Accord Mark IV (1988) ===
The fourth edition of the Accord, established in August 1988, established what it termed the Structural Efficiency Principal (SEP). This principal conferred wage increases to unions who committed to restructuring their industrial awards in the interests of efficiency. Importantly, this was the start of the award restructuring process.

The SEP was another two-tiered system, but with a different scope to the previous one. While the previous Accord tended to promote short-term cost-cutting measures, the SEP had a broad, positive conception of productivity improvement. It encouraged unions to establish skill-based career pathways; training opportunities; broaden the range of tasks each worker could perform, to enable multi-skilling; and minimise demarcation disputes; among other things.

=== Accord Mark V (1989) ===
The fifth edition of the Accord, established in August 1989, continued the process of award restructuring. Wage rises were granted to unions on the condition that they continued implementing the recommendations of the previous Accord. Additionally, their awards would need to permit greater flexibility in working hours and change certain sick leave entitlements.

Broadbanding was another aspect of award restructuring that was used to promote efficiency.

This agreement also included further cuts to personal income taxes as well as some rebates and supplements for families and households.

=== Accord Mark VI (1990) ===
The sixth agreement of the Accord was reached in February 1990. Significantly, it introduced enterprise bargaining. It also built upon the elements of previous Accords, including superannuation, tax cuts, and productivity-based pay bargaining.

However, in November, the Australian Industrial Relations Commission (AIRC) announced their decision to reject this agreement. They stated that employers and trade unions were not yet ready for enterprise bargaining because they held differing perspectives on this reform that they would first need to resolve. Instead of the various elements of the agreement, the AIRC granted a conditional 2.5% pay rise.

=== Accord Mark VII (1991) ===
In October 1991, the AIRC acceded to calls to introduce enterprise bargaining, hence allowing unions to make bargaining agreements with individual employers. The award system remained as a way to protect minimum standards, but enterprise agreements could be negotiated above the award's standards.

This seventh edition of the Accord was hugely influential: it began a process of decentralisation from national, industry-wide agreements and awards to the enterprise level.

=== End of the Accords (1996) ===
An eighth edition of the Accord (Accord Mark VIII) was planned to be implemented after the 1996 election. It promised to target a low inflation rate of 2–3%, to provide extra "safety net" payments to some workers, and to include an extra maternity leave allowance among other things. However, since Labor did not win the election, this plan was never implemented.

The election of John Howard in March 1996 brought a dramatically different economic approach. The new Liberal government sought to further deregulate the labour market by ending wage fixing practices and instead allowing market forces to determine wages. This marked the end of the Accord period and began a period of heightened antagonism between the government and the union movement.

== Results ==
We can compare trends in the years before the Accords to the years during them to assess the economic effects of this agreement. However, due to the multifaceted nature of the economy, it is difficult to gauge the extent to which the Accords contributed to these trends. Furthermore, we cannot know how the economy would have responded to an alternate set of policies.

These trends suggest that the Accord was effective in causing economic growth and employment growth, and modestly effective in dampening inflation.

The following chart shows economic statistics under the Hawke government when compared to the Fraser government that preceded it, excluding years in which the prime ministership changed hands.

Pre-Accord Period vs. Accord Period
	1975–1982 (Avg.)	1984–1991 (Avg.)
Inflation Rate	10.86%	6.43%
Real GDP Growth	1.9%	4.1%
Employment Growth	1.0%	3.0%
Unemployment Rate	6.6%	7.8%
Real Wage Growth	1.2%	-1.0%
Work days lost in disputes per employee	0.55	0.23

Union density in the economy declined during this time period, from 51.4% in 1982 to 32.8% in 1996. Note that trade union density was already declining before the Accord, albeit at a more gradual pace, since 1951 when it had peaked at 60%.

Trade Union Density 1960–1996, with the first Accord (1983) indicated.

== Criticism ==
Criticisms of the Accord have come from both the political Left and Right.

=== Building neoliberalism ===
Elizabeth Humphrys makes the case that the Accord was the major restructuring project that introduced neoliberalism to Australia. She expresses a left-wing criticism that has been made since the time of the Accord by others such as Frank Stilwell. Stilwell claimed that the Accord had succumbed to the principles of "economic rationalism" and became a policy of "austerity and regressive redistribution".

In the era when neoliberal reforms were being made by Thatcher in the UK and Reagan in the US, it was not the conservatives who held power in Australia, but the Labor Party. Humphrys examines how Labor's Accord with the unions entailed nonetheless a very similar response to the economic crisis: labour-market deregulation, suppressed industrial action, and suppressed wage growth. In addition, the Hawke–Keating government conducted privatisation (e.g. of the Commonwealth Bank and Qantas), liberalised trade, and deregulated the financial sector.

Humphrys also notes how Labor acted to maintain the unions' cooperation. In 1989, when airline pilots were demanding a wage rise in excess of the Accord, the Royal Australian Air Force was called in to break the strike. Also, she notes the deregistration of the radical BLF union.

Her analysis is that although neoliberalism was introduced by conservatives in the UK and US, Australia followed a different pathway in which Labor and the unions played an active role. She situates this within the long tradition of corporatism in Australia in which arbitration and the centralised awards system were a collaboration between the working class and the employer class.

In retrospect, she assesses that the Labor Party and the union movement were victims of their own Accord. Due to abandoning the militant struggle for wages, "Unions suffered from declining membership they could not reverse, decreased activity and organisation at the workplace level". It disorganised and reduced the social weight of the union movement and hence also reduced the social weight of the Labor Party.

Further criticisms are made that the Accord promised a wide-ranging social program but it quickly narrowed to a wages policy. Humphrys and Stilwell argue that the working class was made to shoulder the burden of fixing the economy.

There is an argument that neoliberal reforms were inevitable and that the Accord was a better deal than what would have been reached otherwise. To the contrary, Humphrys notes that trade union resistance prevented the previous Liberal government from carrying out adequate neoliberal reforms. Also, as an alternative to neoliberal reforms, Stilwell proposed an interventionist industry policy for the modernisation of Australian industry.

=== Effect on employment ===
In 1983, the Hon Jim Carlton (Liberal member for Mackellar) argued that the Accord would discourage employment:

Today, in my remarks on this Bill, in particular, I speak on behalf of the unemployed. Again, as I do not represent an existing interest group dependent on government protection or largesse and am not fearful of a cessation of benefits, I do not feel obliged to congratulate the Prime Minister (Mr Hawke) on his capacity to assemble and charm the group of people most likely to provide willing or conscripted endorsement of the disgraceful deal cooked up between the ALP and the Australian Council of Trade Unions before the election. This so-called accord-this deal-was and is a recipe for the continuing exclusion of 10 per cent or more of the work force from the opportunity to earn gainful reward for employment.

The Hon Ralph Willis, Minister for Employment and Industrial Relations argued that things were worse under Malcolm Fraser:

The only policy they had for controlling wages during that period and since has been to use the bludgeon of unemployment to reduce wage claims. That was a deliberate act of policy. The former Government pursued budgetary and monetary policies designed to make it more difficult to advance wage claims. As we saw, under such policies an unemployment rate of 10 per cent was needed to bring wage claims down to their present state, one in which virtually no increases at all are taking place.

The official Australian unemployment rate did fall under the early Accord, reaching a minimum of 6% in 1990, but rapidly increased between 1990 and 1992 as part of the early 1990s recession.

=== Responses to criticism ===
Supporters of the Accord, however, pointed to the significant improvements in the social security system that occurred under the ALP governments, including the introduction of rental assistance for social security recipients, extensions in child-care funding, the creation of useful labour market schemes such as NewStart and Jobs, Education and Training, the introduction of Medicare, the indexation of family allowance payments, and the introduction of the Family Income Supplement for low-income working families. Despite a fall in money wages under the ALP, the social wage of Australian workers was argued to have improved as a result of government reforms in health, social welfare, superannuation, and taxation.

In addition, the number of industrial disputes fell, while inflation was brought under control. In the lead up to the 1984 budget, unions agreed to a wage/tax trade-off in which they forwent an indexed wage increase in return for a tax cut geared towards low and middle-income earners. Job protection, family leave, and a standard 38-hour workweek had been extended to most workers, whose living standards were protected via superannuation, social wage improvements, and tax cuts. Union members (and indeed, non-union members who were nonetheless covered by union-negotiated collective agreements) and their families benefited from lower inflation, more jobs, maternity allowances, family leave, trade union education, improved access to education, Medicare, superannuation, higher pensions, occupational health and safety improvements, family income supplements, and regular real wage increases from 1991 onwards (after having fallen under Hawke). Collective bargaining rights were enhanced, while an effective minimum wages system was sustained. By 1991, the lowest paid workers received additional increases through the mechanism of supplementary payments. It is arguable that most Australians were a little better off materially on the eve of the 1991 recession than in 1983. By 1991, despite decline in real wage levels under Hawke, household real incomes rose as a result of social wage and employment changes.
