= Recruitment advertising =

Recruitment advertising, also known as recruitment communications and recruitment agency, includes all communications used by an organization to attract talent to work within it. Recruitment advertisements may be the first impression of a company for many job seekers. In turn, the strength of employer branding in job postings can directly impact interest in job openings.

Recruitment advertisements typically have a uniform layout per HRXML standards and may contain the following elements:

- the job title heading and location
- an explanatory paragraph describing the company, including the employer branding
- a job description
- entry qualifications
- the remuneration package (not always provided by the employer)
- further details and from where application forms may be sought

When faced with hiring many roles, corporate employers have many channels and options to choose from. The employer may:

- Deploy job distribution efforts to free and or paid sources
- Increase promotion of the employer brand
- Deploy search engine optimization (SEO) efforts for employer career sites and jobs
- Increase social media outreach
- Retain a search firm
- Partner with a contingency search firm
- Retain a recruitment process outsourcing organization
- Use a candidate fulfillment service
- Retain a recruitment advertising agency
- Retain a specialist interactive recruitment advertising agency
- Leverage old media to advertise their openings (print, radio and television)
- Leverage job boards
- Leverage new media
- Invest in additional internal resources

Each of these channels has its benefits and many firms will use a mix of some or all of the above options.

The use of a specialist recruitment advertising agency enables organizations to receive professional advice on media, design and copywriting specifically related to the recruitment process. This may enable employer's advertisements to stand out in relevant publications to build their employer brand. Employer advertisers are also now able to use microsites to post job content, allowing job postings to be more creative with minimal copy, although it is a common understanding by search engine optimization firms that detailed, relevant content is necessary for successful optimization efforts. Recruitment advertising has now developed into a specialty service where most leading organizations hire agencies for their expertise.

The methodologies for recruiting talent are evolving. For example, sites have been developed for freelancers to bid on advertised jobs. These sites are normally free to join, but the agency will take between 10% and 25% of applicants' earnings.

== See also ==
- Freelancer
