= International Association of Administrative Professionals =

Professional association for administrative workers

- Website: www.iaap-hq.org

The International Association of Administrative Professionals (IAAP) is a non-profit, professional networking and educational organization. It was formed in Kansas City, Missouri in 1942 as the National Secretaries Association. The name of the organization was changed in 1982 to Professional Secretaries International, and in 1998 to its current name.

IAAP's core purpose is to provide education, certification, and leadership development to administrative professionals.

In 1951, IAAP administered the first Certified Professional Secretary (CPS) exam. Today, the certification program administers the Certification Certified Administrative Professional (CAP) exam. After successfully attaining the CAP credential, admins become eligible for IAAP's specialty certificate courses. Currently, IAAP offers Technology Applications (TA), Organizational Management (OM), and Project Management (PM) specialty certificate courses.

In 1952, Mary Barrett, then-president of the National Secretaries Association, C. King Woodbridge, president of Dictaphone Corporation, and American businessman Harry F. Klemfuss created a special Secretary's Day recognition, to acknowledge the hard work of the women in the office. The event caught on, and during the fourth week of April the holiday is now celebrated in offices all over the world. In 2000, the event was renamed "Administrative Professionals Week" to recognize people working in the administrative support field with other job titles such as receptionist, office manager, executive assistant, administrative coordinator, management assistant, or administrative assistant.

IAAP publishes a magazine seven times per year for its members and subscribers, entitled Office Pro. The organization also hosts several in-person education events each year.
