= Administrative Professionals Day =

Day to recognize secretaries and others

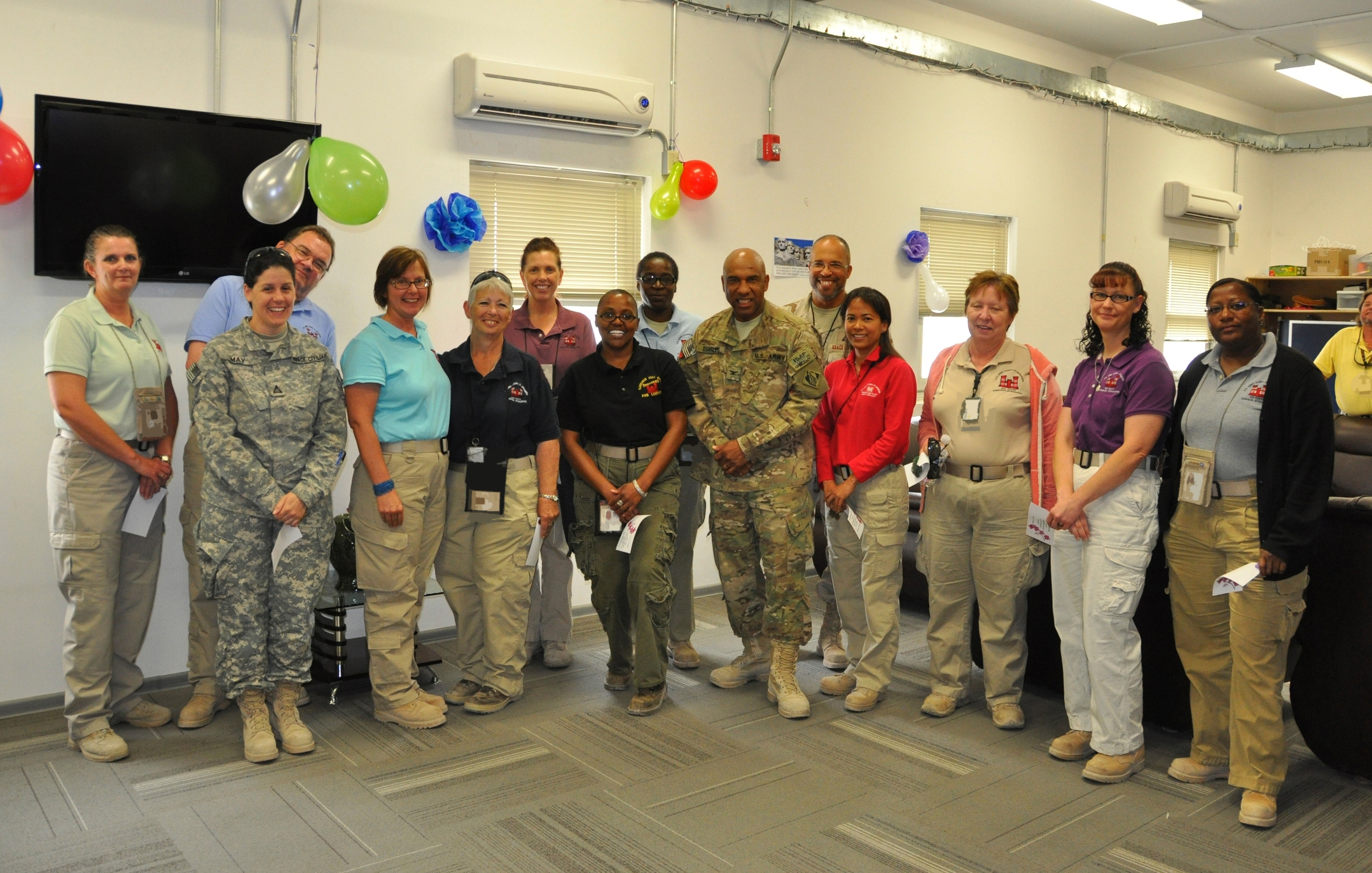
A United States Army Corps of Engineers celebration for Administrative Professionals' Day

Administrative Professionals Day (also known as Secretaries Day or Admins Day) is a day observed yearly in a small number of countries. It is not a public holiday in any of them. In some countries, it falls within Administrative Professionals Week (the last full week of April in the United States). The day recognizes the work of secretaries, administrative assistants, executive assistants, personal assistants, receptionists, client services representatives, and other administrative support professionals. Typically, administrative professionals are given cards, flowers, chocolates, and lunches.

== Observance by country ==
- In the United States, and Canada, it is celebrated annually on the Wednesday of the last full week of April.
- In South Africa, it is celebrated annually on the first Wednesday of September.
- In Australia it is celebrated on the first Friday in May.
- In Brazil, it is celebrated on September 30.
- In Colombia, it is celebrated on April 26. In 2025 it falls together with Children's Day.

== History ==
During World War II, there was a shortage of skilled administrative personnel in the United States due to Depression-era birth-rate decline and booming post-war business. The National Secretaries Association, founded in 1942, was formed to recognize the contributions of administrative personnel to the economy, support their personal development, and to help attract workers to the administrative field. Key figures who created the holiday were the president of the National Secretaries Association, Mary Barrett; president of Dictaphone Corporation, C. King Woodbridge; and public relations account executives at Young & Rubicam, Harry F. Klemfuss and Daren Ball.

The National Secretaries Association's name was changed to Professional Secretaries International in 1981 and to the International Association of Administrative Professionals (IAAP) in 1998. Administrative Professionals Day is a registered trademark with registration number 2475334 (serial number 75/898930). The registrant is IAAP.

The official period of celebration was first proclaimed by U.S. Secretary of Commerce Charles W. Sawyer as "National Secretaries Week", which was held June 1–7 in 1952 with Wednesday, June 4 designated as National Secretaries' Day. The first Secretaries' Day was sponsored by the National Secretaries Association with the support of corporate groups.

In 1955, the observance date of National Secretaries Week was moved to the last full week of April, with Wednesday now designated as Administrative Professionals Day. The name was changed to Professional Secretaries Week in 1981 and became Administrative Professionals Week in 2000 to encompass the expanding responsibilities and wide-ranging job titles of administrative support staff in the modern economy. The week-long observance was created in order to space out the bookings at restaurants, country clubs, and other places where administrative professionals would be taken out to lunch.

== Criticism ==
Some critics regard the day as an invention of the flower, card, and candy industries for generating sales between Easter and Mother's Day, which is the second Sunday of May in the United States. It has also been argued that the traditional gifts of flowers and cards unintentionally mark the holiday and the administrative role as a gendered one, since these are typically feminine gifts, and that a specific day to celebrate administrative professionals isolates them from the rest of their workplace peers.

== See also ==
- Boss's Day
- Employee Appreciation Day
- Hallmark holiday
