= Hawke–Keating government =

Prime Ministers of Australia from 1983 until 1996

Hawke–Keating government

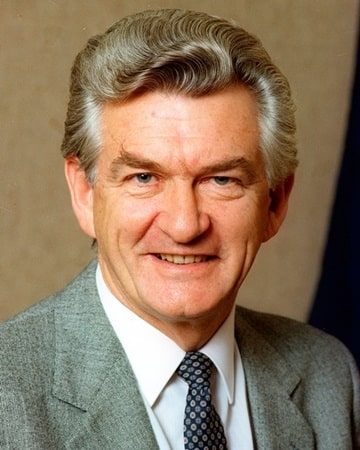

In office
- 11 March 1983 – 11 March 1996
- Prime Minister: Bob Hawke (1983–1991); Paul Keating (1991–1996)
- Party: Labor
- Origin: Won 1983 election
- Demise: Lost 1996 election
- Predecessor: Fraser government
- Successor: Howard government

The Hawke–Keating government is an all-encompassing term to describe the duration of the Hawke government and the Keating government, which together spanned from 11 March 1983 to 11 March 1996. Both governments were formed by the Australian Labor Party, and were led from 1983 to 1991 by Bob Hawke as prime minister, and from 1991 to 1996 by Paul Keating as prime minister, with Keating serving as Treasurer throughout the Hawke government. During the Hawke–Keating government, the Labor Party won five successive federal elections, its most electorally successful period to date; the 13-year uninterrupted period of government also remains the Labor Party's longest spell in power at the federal level. This period in Australia’s political history is also referred to as the Hawke–Keating era.

The Hawke–Keating government began after the Fraser government was defeated at the 1983 election and ended with defeat at the 1996 election, which ushered in the Howard government. In between those elections were further victories in 1984, 1987, 1990 and 1993. The Hawke–Keating government has been described by Labor figures as the party's most successful period in government in its history, and has generally been reviewed positively by historians for its degree of achievement. Scholars and politicians have noted the importance of the powerful political and personal partnership that developed between Hawke and Keating to the success of the government.

== Economic reforms ==
The economic reforms pursued by the Hawke–Keating government has been claimed by numerous economic commentators and journalists since to have been the basis for both the modernisation and internationalisation of the Australian economy, and for triggering an unprecedentedly long period of economic growth, with Australia's gross domestic product increasing every year for 30 years after 1991; commentators have also credited the government's policies with bringing to an end what had been chronic inflation and balance of payments difficulties for Australia, enabling longer periods of stability and growth in both GDP and unemployment.

=== Macroeconomic modernisation ===
According to the journalist Paul Kelly, "the most influential economic decisions of the 1980s were the floating of the Australian dollar and the deregulation of the financial system". Although the Fraser government had played a part in the process of financial deregulation by commissioning the 1981 Campbell Report, opposition from Fraser himself had stalled this process. Shortly after its election in 1983, the Hawke government took the opportunity to implement a comprehensive program of economic reform, in the process "transform(ing) economics and politics in Australia". Hawke and Keating together led the process for overseeing the economic changes by launching a "National Economic Summit" one month after their election in 1983, which brought together business and industrial leaders together with politicians and trade union leaders; the three-day summit led to a unanimous adoption of a national economic strategy, generating sufficient political capital for widespread reform to follow.

Among other reforms, the Hawke government floated the Australian dollar, repealed rules that prohibited foreign-owned banks to operate in Australia, dismantled the protectionist tariff system, privatised several state sector industries, ended the subsidisation of loss-making industries, and sold off part of the state-owned Commonwealth Bank. The government also pursued the establishment of a new signature industrial relations and wages policy, the Prices and Incomes Accord. This was an agreement directly between the Australian Council of Trade Unions (ACTU) and the government to guarantee a reduction in demands for wage increases, in exchange for the government providing a significant increase in social programmes, including the introduction of Medicare and the Family Assistance Scheme; in so doing, the government was able to reduce inflation and unemployment over the decade. In the wake of the introduction of these macroeconomic reforms, in 1984 Keating was named Euromoney Finance Minister of the Year.

=== Industrial relations policy ===
As a former ACTU President, Hawke was well-placed to engage in reform of the industrial relations system in Australia, taking a lead on this policy area as in few others. Working closely with ministerial colleagues and the ACTU Secretary, Bill Kelty, Hawke negotiated with trade unions to establish the Prices and Incomes Accord in 1983, an agreement whereby unions agreed to restrict their demands for wage increases, and in turn the government guaranteed to both minimise inflation and promote an increased social wage, including by establishing new social programmes such as Medicare.

Inflation had been a significant issue for the previous decade prior to the election of the Hawke government, regularly running into double-digits. The process of the Accord, by which the government and trade unions would arbitrate and agree upon wage increases in many sectors, led to a decrease in both inflation and unemployment through to 1990. Criticisms of the Accord would come from both the right and the left of politics. Left-wing critics claimed that it kept real wages stagnant, and that the Accord was a policy of class collaboration and corporatism. By contrast, right-wing critics claimed that the Accord reduced the flexibility of the wages system. Supporters of the Accord, however, pointed to the improvements in the social security system that occurred, including the introduction of rental assistance for social security recipients, the creation of labour market schemes such as NewStart, and the introduction of the Family Income Supplement. In 1986, the Hawke government passed a bill to de-register the Builders Labourers Federation federally due to the union not following the Accord agreements.

Despite a percentage fall in real money wages from 1983 to 1991, the social wage of Australian workers was argued by the government to have improved drastically as a result of these reforms, and the ensuing decline in inflation. The Accord was revisited six further times during the Hawke government, each time in response to new economic developments. The seventh and final revisiting would ultimately lead to the establishment of the enterprise bargaining system, although this would be finalised shortly after Hawke left office in 1991.

=== Taxation, budget and interest rates ===
The Australian taxation system was significantly reformed during the period of the government, with income tax and company tax rates reduced and the introduction of a fringe benefits tax and a capital gains tax; the latter two reforms were strongly opposed by the Liberal Party at the time, but were never reversed by them when they eventually returned to office in 1996. Partially offsetting these imposts upon the business community was the introduction of full dividend imputation, a reform insisted upon by Keating. During this period, Keating advocated for the introduction of a consumption tax to address the chronic balance of payments problems being faced by Australia; after initially supporting this approach, Hawke later blocked the tax on the grounds of its unpopularity. Keating later caused considerable public comment and a degree of controversy, when he declared on a radio programme in 1986 that if Australia did not address the balance of payments, the country risked degenerating to the status of a "banana republic". The government increased efforts to deal with the issue, and no consumption tax to generate a significant increase in incomings, the government began a process to significantly reduce government outlays instead, resulting in some criticism from the grassroots of the Labor Party, who opposed any cuts to spending. Despite this criticism from some, the government was able to produce a national budget surplus for the years 1988, 1989 and 1990, with the surplus of 1988 proving to be the largest budget surplus in Australian history.

Towards the end of the 1980s, the government was heavily criticised by some for maintaining consistently high interest rates, which Hawke and Keating argued were necessary to reduce economic growth gradually so that demand for imports did not grow out of control. Throughout the 1980s, both the global and Australian economies grew quickly, and by the late 1980s, inflation had grown to around 9%. By 1988, the Reserve Bank of Australia began tightening monetary policy, and household interest rates peaked at 18%. It has been suggested by some that the Bank was too slow in easing monetary policy, and that this ultimately led to a recession. In private, Keating had argued for rates to rise earlier than they did, and fall sooner, although his view was at odds with the Reserve Bank and his Treasury colleagues. Publicly, Hawke and Keating had said there would be no recession – or that there would be a "soft landing" – but this changed when Keating announced the country was indeed in recession in 1990, several months after the Hawke government had won an unprecedented fourth consecutive term in office. Announcing the recession, Keating memorably stated that the recession was a "recession Australia had to have". The remark was referred to by political journalist Paul Kelly as "perhaps the most stupid remark of Keating's career, and it nearly cost him the Prime Ministership." Kelly did also concede that, "...however, it is largely true that the boom begat the recession."

=== Compulsory superannuation and enterprise bargaining ===
During Keating's period as prime minister, the government legislated one of its most far-reaching achievements, the introduction of the National Superannuation Scheme, implemented to address Australia's long-term problem of chronically low national savings. This initiative built on policies that Keating had pursued whilst Treasurer, and was aimed at ensuring that most Australians would have enough money to retire. In 1992, the compulsory employer contribution scheme became a part of a wider reform package addressing this retirement income dilemma. It had been demonstrated that Australia, along with many other Western nations, would experience a major demographic shift in the coming decades, due to ageing population, and it was claimed that this would result in increased pension payments that would place an unaffordable strain on the Australian economy.

Keating's solution was a "three pillars" approach to retirement income, requiring compulsory employer contributions to superannuation funds, permitting further contributions to superannuation funds and other investments, and introducing, where this was insufficient, a safety net consisting of a means-tested government-funded age pension. The compulsory employer contributions were branded "Superannuation Guarantee" (SG) contributions. As a result of this policy, along with the gradual increases in the minimum contribution amount, Australia grew to become the fourth largest holder of pension fund assets in the world, with a balance of nearly AU$3 trillion in superannuation assets by 2020.

In the aftermath of the 1990 recession, Keating and his Treasurer, John Dawkins, countered the Opposition's 'Fightback!' proposals with a package that came to be known as 'One Nation', which involved using funding from the national budget surplus to produce new welfare-to-work programmes, as well as introducing a new degree of competition within the telecommunications and communications industries and creating the Australian National Training Authority (ANTA). 'One Nation' also proposed a series of further tax cuts for middle-income workers coming in two tranches, in 1993 and 1995, although these would later be deferred to 1995 and 1998, a move which cost the government considerable political support among the public. The final major economic policy development of the Hawke–Keating government was the introduction of an enterprise bargaining scheme as part of the final stage of the Prices and Incomes Accord, intended to allow for greater flexibility and economies of scale within industrial wage arbitration; much of this would be curtailed by the Howard government after 1996.

== Healthcare, education and social policy ==
=== Introduction of universal health care ===
From 1983 to 1989, the government oversaw the permanent establishment of universal health care in Australia, with the creation of Medicare. Universal health care had already been introduced under the branding of Medibank by Prime Minister Gough Whitlam, but this had been quickly curtailed by the Fraser government. Hawke and Keating argued that it would be necessary for Labor to win over several elections in order to embed Medicare, so that any future Coalition government could not dismantle it; this proved to be correct, with the Coalition accepting ahead of the 1996 election that Medicare would remain permanent. The establishment of Medicare formed part of the Prices and Incomes Accord, under which terms trade unions agreed to restrain their demands for wage increases in exchange for the establishment of social benefits such as Medicare.

The government also oversaw the introduction of a Pharmaceutical Allowance to help pay the cost of prescription medicines. The government's response to the 1980s AIDS crisis is also considered to have been a success by international standards. In addition, nursing education was transferred from hospital-based programs to the tertiary education sector, while Australia's first ever national mental health policy was proclaimed.

=== Overhaul of education ===
The Hawke–Keating government oversaw a significantly increased period of funding for Australian education, with both men arguing that it would be one of the government's principle objectives to widen educational opportunities for all Australians. Increased funding was made available for most schools, while both TAFE and higher education were dramatically expanded. Measures were also taken to improve educational opportunities for Aborigines, as demonstrated by the government providing funding of almost $100 million from 1984 to 1992 for parental education, student support and tutorial assistance through its Aboriginal Education Direct Assistance Program. In addition, an Aboriginal and Torres Strait Islander Capital Grants Program was established to construct and renovate school buildings in remote area communalities.

Government expenditure on education, on a per-student basis, amounted to 136% for government schools and 71% for non-government schools. A Participation and Equity Program was also established which provided around $250 million mainly to schools with low retention to the end of secondary education. Student numbers in training and vocational education (mainly in TAFE colleges) rose by over 25% under Hawke. University enrolments rose by almost 57%, from 357,000 in 1984 to 559,000 in 1992. The percentage of students in secondary education rose substantially, from 35% in 1982 to 77% in 1992, partly as a result of greater financial assistance to students from low-income backgrounds. Most notably, at the beginning of the Hawke–Keating government, approximately 3 in 10 Australian children completed high school; by the end of the government in 1996, that number had risen to 9 in 10.

In 1989, the government gradually began a policy of re-introducing some fees for university study. It set up the Higher Education Contributions Scheme (HECS), which was first proposed by Professor Murray Wells and subsequently developed by economist and lecturer at the Australian National University, Bruce Chapman and championed by Education Minister John Dawkins (see Dawkins Revolution). Under the original HECS, a $1,800 fee was charged to all university students, and the Commonwealth paid the balance. A student could defer payment of this HECS amount (in which case it was called a HECS debt) and repay the debt through the tax system, when the student's income exceeds a threshold level. As part of the reforms, Colleges of Advanced Education entered the University sector by various means. The HECS system was accepted by both federal political parties and continues to this day.

=== Welfare and social reforms ===
The Hawke–Keating government oversaw a massive expansion of targeted welfare assistance throughout its period in office, creating subsidised homecare services, eliminating poverty traps in the welfare system, increasing the real value of the old-age pension, reintroducing the six-monthly indexation of single-person unemployment benefits, and establishing a wide-ranging programme for paid family support, known as the Family Income Supplement. During the 1980s, the proportion of total government outlays allocated to families, the sick, single parents, widows, the handicapped, and veterans was significantly higher than under the previous Fraser and Whitlam governments.

During the course of the government, benefits substantially improved the incomes of the bottom 20% of households, with rent assistance, family payments, and sole parent benefits all substantially boosted in real terms. According to some historians, when examining the economic reforms carried out during the Eighties in both Australia and New Zealand, "some modest case can be mounted for Labor in Australia as refurbisher of the welfare state". From 1983 to 1996, improved service provision, higher government transfer payments, and changes to the taxation system "either entirely offset, or at the very least substantially moderated, the increase in inequality of market incomes over the period". During the period 1983 to 1996, Australia was one of the leading OECD countries in terms of social expenditure growth, with total social spending increasing by more than four percentage points of GDP compared to an OECD average of around 2.5 percentage points.

"Active society" measures were also introduced in an attempt to limit the growth of poverty and inequality. From 1980 to 1994, financial assistance for low-income families in Australia increased from 60% of the OECD average in 1980 to 140% in 1994, and it is argued that the social and economic policies delivered under the government-trade union Accord had some substantial success in reducing family poverty, as characterised by reductions in child poverty from the early Eighties onwards. According to the OECD, the percentage of Australians living in poverty fell during the Hawke government's time in office, from 11.6% of the population in 1985–86 to 9.3% in 1989–90. Child poverty also fell dramatically under the Hawke–Keating government, with the percentage of children estimated to be living in poverty falling from nearly 16% in 1985 to around 11% by 1995. As noted by Brian Howe, social policy under Hawke was effective in reducing poverty and protecting those most vulnerable to massive social and economic change. According to some observers, "improvements in government policies and programs in income support payments, and services such as education, health, public housing and child care, and the progressive nature of the income tax system, have all contributed to the result that Australia appears to have become a more equal society over the period from 1981–82 to 1993–94".

The government's achievements in boosting financial support to low-income households were regarded by experts in the field as substantial, with the family assistance package bringing significant benefits to millions of low-income families in the years ahead. As noted by Ann Harding at the University of Canberra

"To appreciate the scale of these changes, let us look at the Browns, a hypothetical family. Mr Brown works for a low wage, Mrs Brown looks after two children, and they rent their home. In late 1982 the Browns received just under $13 a week in family allowance – about $25 per week in 1995–96 dollars. In contrast, in January 1996 a family like the Browns would receive $93.10 in family payment and up to $40 a week in rent assistance. You put this in perspective; such a family would have received assistance worth about 4 per cent of average weekly ordinary time earnings in November 1982, but 20 per cent of such earnings in early 1996. We are thus talking about very major changes in the amount of assistance available to low-income working families with children".

Further social reforms were achieved in the field of gender equality, with the passage of the Sex Discrimination Act 1984, the first bill of its kind in Australian history, which prohibited discrimination on the grounds of sexism.

== Aboriginal affairs ==
Although Hawke spoke throughout his time as prime minister of the idea of a treaty between Aboriginal Australians and the government, no such treaty was ever concluded though subsequent events. While Hawke did appointed Charles Perkins as Secretary of the Department of Aboriginal Affairs, making him the first Indigenous Australian to head a Commonwealth department, little concrete policy action was taken during this time. However, in 1985 the government did return ownership of Uluru (formerly known as Ayers Rock), with Governor General Sir Ninian Stephen presiding over the ceremony handing the title deeds to the local Pitjantjatjara Aboriginal people. The transfer was done on the basis that a lease-back to the National Parks and Wildlife Service and joint management by members of the local Mutijulu community would be settled upon.

=== Land rights ===
During Keating's time as prime minister, he gave a high priority to progressing and defining Aboriginal Reconciliation. Robert Tickner was the Federal Minister for Aboriginal and Torres Strait Islander Affairs from 1990 to 1996. The Council for Aboriginal Reconciliation was established in February 1992 and in 1993 the government passed the Native Title Act in response to the High Court's historic decision in Mabo v Queensland. It was Australia's first national native title legislation. Six months after the Mabo Decision, Keating delivered his Redfern Park Speech to launch the International Year for the World's Indigenous People. Written by Keating's advisor Don Watson, it articulated the philosophical backdrop to the Keating government's subsequent Native Title Act and Land Fund and Indigenous Land Corporation (ATSIC Amendment) Act 1995, which amended the Aboriginal and Torres Strait Islander Commission Act 1989 to establish the Aboriginal and Torres Strait Islander Land Fund and Indigenous Land Corporation. Little noticed at the time, the Redfern Speech is now recognised by many observers as historic and significant. Addressing remarks to non-indigenous Australia, Keating said:

It begins, I think, with the act of recognition. Recognition that it was we who did the dispossessing. We took the traditional lands and smashed the traditional way of life. We brought the disasters. The alcohol. We committed the murders. We took the children from their mothers. We practised discrimination and exclusion.

== Constitutional reforms and national debates ==
In April 1984, the Hawke government proclaimed Advance Australia Fair as Australia's national anthem, settling an ongoing debate, and at the same time declared green and gold as the national colours of Australia. The government later secured passage of the Australia Acts in 1986, officially severing remaining constitutional ties to the United Kingdom, and ending the inclusion into Australian law of British Acts of Parliament, and abolishing remaining provisions for appeals to the Judicial Committee of the Privy Council in London.

Canberra's New Parliament House was officially opened by Queen Elizabeth II in a grand ceremony in May 1988 and Australian Bicentenary was marked by huge pomp and ceremony across Australia to mark anniversary of the arrival of the First Fleet of British ships at Sydney in 1788. The government refused to fund the tall ship First Fleet Re-enactment Voyage which was staged on Sydney Harbour on Australia Day because it believed this might offend indigenous Australians.

=== Republicanism ===
During Keating's time as prime minister, he launched a significant period of public debate and discussion around the constitutional settlement within Australia, announcing that he wanted Australia to change its national flag because it contained the Union Jack within its design, and supporting Australian republicanism. In February 1992, Elizabeth II visited Australia for the Sydney Council's 150th anniversary and Keating greeted the Queen with a speech in which he spoke of a growing "national purpose" and "independence" in Australia. He was then accused by the British press of breaching protocol by putting his arm around the Queen's back. When queried about these events in Parliament on 27 February 1992, Keating launched a repudiation of Australian ties to Britain and called the Liberals "'bootlickers" and "lickspitters" and accused them of "cultural cringe to a country which decided not to defend the Malay peninsula, not to worry about Singapore, not to give us our troops back to keep ourselves free from Japanese domination".

Keating proceeded with measures to remove the symbolism of Monarchy in Australia, removing reference to the Queen from Citizenship and Ministerial Oaths. In April 1993, the establishment of a Republic Advisory Committee was announced; Keating advocated a minimalist change model involving parliamentary appointment of a president – this was criticised by members of the ALP left and by the new leader of the Australian Democrats, Cheryl Kernot who wanted more substantial change, such as direct election. The committee, chaired by Malcolm Turnbull of the Australian Republican Movement, submitted its report to the government on 5 October 1993 and Keating announced a working party of ministers to develop a paper for cabinet. Keating ultimately put forward a minimalist republican model. In June 1995, in a televised speech to Parliament entitled "An Australian Republic: The Way Forward", Keating outlined a minimalist plan for a republic involving a president selected by a two-thirds majority of Parliament, following nomination by the Prime Minister and Cabinet. The reserve powers and ceremonial duties of the Governor-General were to be maintained. This was proposed to be put to a referendum in 1998 or 1999. After John Howard won the 1996 election and established the Australian Constitutional Convention 1998, which settled on a similar republican model to that proposed by Keating, this proposal was defeated in the 1999 Australian republic referendum.

== Foreign affairs ==
The Hawke–Keating government oversaw a period of significant change in Australia's foreign affairs and international policy. Hawke sought to raise Australia's international profile in the United States, Russia, China, Japan and south-east Asia and also took an interest in the Israeli–Palestinian conflict; Keating, when Prime Minister, became a fierce advocate of greater Australian integration within ASEAN.

=== Creation of APEC ===
Arguably the most significant foreign policy achievement of the government took place in 1989, after Hawke proposed a south-east Asian region-wide forum for leaders and economic ministers to discuss issues of common concern. After winning the support of key countries in the region, this led to the creation of the Asia-Pacific Economic Cooperation (APEC). The first APEC meeting duly took place in Canberra in November 1989; the economic ministers of Australia, Brunei, Canada, Indonesia, Japan, South Korea, Malaysia, New Zealand, Philippines, Singapore, Thailand and the United States all attended. APEC would subsequently grow to become one of the most pre-eminent high-level international forums in the world, particularly after the later inclusions of China and Russia, and the Keating government's later establishment of the APEC Leaders' Forum.

Upon becoming prime minister, Keating developed this idea further, winning the support in 1993 of recently elected US President Bill Clinton and Chinese Premier Li Peng to expand APEC to a full Leaders' Meeting. This led to APEC becoming one of the most significant high-level international summits, and at the 1994 APEC Leaders' Meeting, hosted by Indonesia, members agreed to the Keating government's proposals for what became known as the Bogor Declaration, which set targets for a significant increase in free trade and investment between industrialised APEC countries by 2010 and between developing APEC countries by 2020. In December 1993, Keating became involved in a diplomatic incident with Malaysia when he described Prime Minister Mahathir Mohamad as "recalcitrant". The incident occurred after Mahathir refused to attend the 1993 APEC summit. Keating said, "APEC is bigger than all of us – Australia, the U.S. and Malaysia, and Mahathir and any other recalcitrants." The translation of the word "recalcitrant" into Malaysian rendered the word a more egregious insult, and Mahathir demanded an apology from Keating, threatening to reduce diplomatic ties and trade drastically with Australia, which became an enormous concern to Australian exporters. Some Malaysian officials talked of launching a "Buy Australian Last" campaign; Keating subsequently apologised to Mahathir over the remark.

=== Asia ===
Elsewhere in Asia, the government played a significant role in the build-up to the United Nations peace process for Cambodia, culminating in the Transitional Authority; Foreign Minister Gareth Evans, who served under both Hawke and Keating, was nominated for the Nobel Peace Prize for his role in negotiations. Hawke also took a major public stand in the aftermath of the Tiananmen square massacre in 1989; despite having spent years trying to get closer relations with China, Hawke gave a tearful address on national television describing the massacre in graphic detail, and unilaterally offered asylum to over 42,000 Chinese students who were living in Australia at the time, many of whom had publicly supported the Tiananmen protesters. Hawke did so without even consulting his Cabinet, stating later that he felt he simply had to act.

Throughout his time as prime minister, Keating took a number of steps to strengthen and develop bilateral links with Australia's closest neighbours; he frequently said that there was no country in the world that was more important to Australia than Indonesia, and undertook his first overseas visit to the country, becoming the first Australian Prime Minister to do so. Keating made a conscious effort to develop a personal relationship with Indonesian President Suharto, and to include Indonesia in multilateral forums attended by Australia. Keating's friendship with Suharto was criticised by human rights activists supportive of East Timorese independence, and by Nobel Peace Prize winner José Ramos-Horta. The Keating government's cooperation with the Indonesian military, and the signing of the Timor Gap Treaty, were also strongly criticised by these same groups. It was alleged by some that Keating was overlooking alleged human rights abuses by the Indonesian government as part of his effort to dramatically increase Australia's cultural, diplomatic and economic ties with Asia.

As part of a policy of cultivating ties with neighbouring Indonesia, the Hawke government negotiated a zone of co-operation in an area between the Indonesian province of East Timor and northern Australia, known as the Timor Gap Treaty, signed between the governments of Australia and Indonesia. The signatories to the treaty were then Australian Foreign Affairs Minister Gareth Evans and then Indonesian Foreign Minister Ali Alatas. The treaty was signed on 11 December 1989 and came into force on 9 February 1991. It provided for the joint exploitation of petroleum resources in a part of the Timor Sea seabed which were claimed by both Australia and Indonesia and was considered controversial for its overt recognition of Indonesia's sovereignty over East Timor.

=== United States ===
Hawke developed a close relationship with Republican Party Presidents Ronald Reagan and George H W Bush, as well as Secretary of State George Shultz. By Hawke's own account, he was an enthusiastic supporter of the US Alliance, though, on various occasions, he had to persuade less enthusiastic members of his caucus to agree to the party line. In 1985, the MX Missile controversy saw Hawke, under pressure from within the Labor Party, withdraw support for the splash down and monitoring of long range missile tests planned by the United States in Australian waters. That same year, the ANZUS Alliance was shaken by the decision of New Zealand to block visits by nuclear ships of the United States Navy at New Zealand ports. Hawke unsuccessfully lobbied New Zealand Prime Minister David Lange to change the policy and the ANZUS Treaty faced its most serious test.

=== Gulf War ===
In the biggest mobilisation of Australian Armed Forces since the Vietnam War, the government committed Australian naval forces to the 1991 Gulf War in support of the United States-led coalition against the regime of Saddam Hussein, following the invasion of oil-rich Kuwait by Iraq on 2 August 1990.

The United States amassed a 30-nation coalition of some 30,000 troops and the UN Security Council issued an ultimatum to Iraq for the withdrawal. Operation Desert Storm, an air bombardment, followed by a 43-day war followed Iraq's failure to withdraw. The Royal Australian Navy (RAN) provided vessels for the multi-national naval force, patrolling the Persian Gulf to enforce the UN sanctions. The government elected to maintain an Australian naval presence in the Gulf following the surrender of Iraq and 1991 Peace Treaty. Ultimately, though Iraq withdrew from Kuwait, its failure to adhere to other conditions of the 1991 Treaty led to the second Iraq War a decade later. In an address to the nation explaining Australia's involvement, Hawke said that to protect small nations, sometimes "tragically", we must fight for peace.

=== Apartheid South Africa ===
Through his role on the Commonwealth Heads of Government Meeting, Hawke played a leading role in ensuring the Commonwealth initiated an international boycott on foreign investment into South Africa, building on work undertaken by his predecessor Malcolm Fraser, and in the process clashing publicly with British Prime Minister Margaret Thatcher, who initially favoured a more cautious approach. The resulting boycott, led by the Commonwealth, was widely credited with helping bring about the collapse of apartheid, and resulted in a high-profile visit by Nelson Mandela in October 1990, months after the latter's release from a 27-year stint in prison. During the visit, Mandela publicly thanked the Hawke government for the role it played in the boycott.

== Environmental policies ==
The government drew international attention for a series of notable environmental decisions, particularly in its second and third terms. In 1983, Hawke personally vetoed the construction of the Franklin Dam in Tasmania, responding to a groundswell of protest around the issue. Hawke also secured the nomination of the Wet Tropics of Queensland as a UNESCO World Heritage Site in 1987, preventing the forests there from being logged. Hawke would later appoint Graham Richardson as Environment Minister, tasking him with winning the second-preference support from environmental parties, something which Richardson later claimed was the major factor in the government's narrow re-election at the 1990 election. In the government's fourth term, Hawke personally led the Australian delegation to secure changes to the Protocol on Environmental Protection to the Antarctic Treaty, ultimately winning a guarantee that drilling for minerals within Antarctica would be totally prohibited until 2048 at the earliest. Hawke later claimed that the Antarctic drilling ban was his "proudest achievement".

== See also ==
- First Hawke Ministry
- Second Hawke Ministry
- Third Hawke Ministry
- Fourth Hawke Ministry
- First Keating Ministry
- Second Keating Ministry

== Bibliography ==
- Paul Kelly (1992). The End of Certainty: The story of the 1980s. Allen & Unwin. ISBN 1-86373-227-6.
- Edwards, John (1996). Keating: The Inside Story. Penguin. ISBN 9780140266016.
