= Boss's Day =

Unofficial observance, October 16

Boss' Day
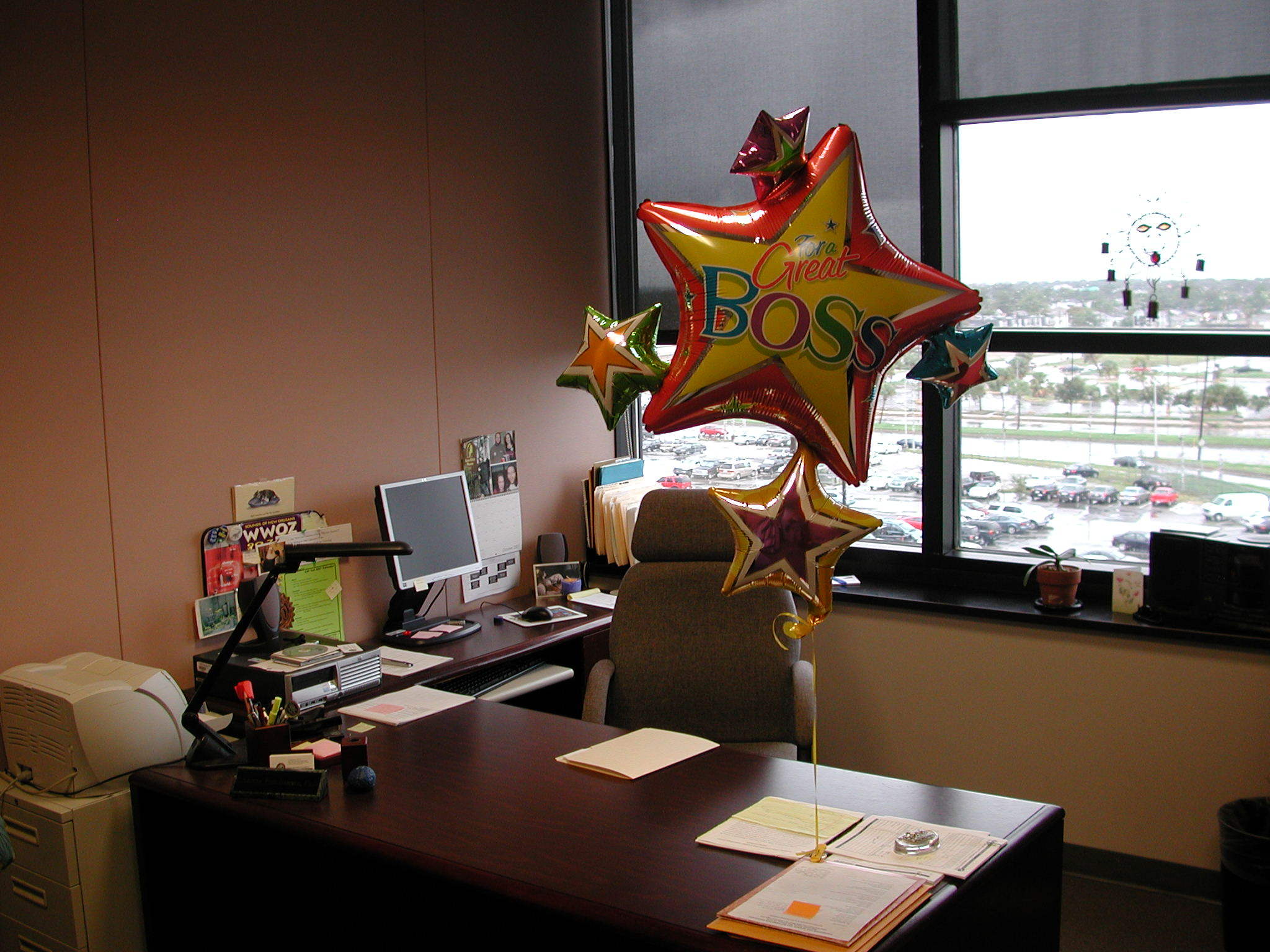
- Balloons for Boss' Day
- Observed by: United States
- Date: October 16 (or nearest working day)
- Frequency: Annual

Boss's Day (also written Bosses Day or Boss' Day) is nationally observed on October 16 in the United States. It has been pitched as a day for employees to thank their bosses for being kind and fair throughout the year. It has been described as a Hallmark holiday and has been criticized as being unnecessary and meaningless, while pressuring employees due to the power dynamic that exists in workplaces.

== History ==
Patricia Bays Haroski registered "National Boss' Day" with the U.S. Chamber of Commerce in 1958. She was working as a secretary for State Farm Insurance Company in Deerfield, Illinois for her father at the time and chose October 16, which was her father's birthday.

The purpose was to show the appreciation for her bosses she thought they deserved. This was also a strategy to attempt to improve intra-office relationships between managers and their employees. Haroski believed young employees sometimes did not understand the hard work and dedication that their supervisors put into their work and the challenges they faced. Four years later, in 1962, Illinois Governor Otto Kerner backed Haroski's registration and officially proclaimed the day.

Hallmark Cards did not offer a Boss' Day card for sale until 1979. It increased the size of its National Boss' Day line by 28 percent in 2007.

== Criticism ==
Alison Green in U.S. News criticized it, saying "Traditional etiquette says quite clearly that any gift-giving in the workplace should be from a boss to an employee and not the other way around. The idea is that people shouldn't feel obligated to purchase gifts for someone who has power over their livelihood, and managers shouldn't benefit from the power dynamic in that way."

The Society for Human Resource Management suggests having HR handle appreciation for supervisors may be more appropriate in large companies.

== See also ==
- Employee Appreciation Day
- Administrative Professionals Day
- Industrial relations

== Sources ==
- Sasoon, R (2009). Going Through the Miles to Become a Boss. NY, New York. Crossroads Press.
