= Chief human resources officer =

Corporate title

A chief human resources officer (CHRO) or chief people officer (CPO) is a corporate officer who oversees all aspects of human resource management and industrial relations policies, practices and operations for an organization. Similar job titles include: head of HR, chief personnel officer, executive vice president of human resources and senior vice president of human resources. Roles and responsibilities of a typical CHRO can be categorized as follows: workforce strategist, organizational and performance conductor, HR service delivery owner, compliance and governance regulator, and coach and adviser to the senior leadership team and the board of directors. CHROs may also be involved in board member selection and orientation, executive compensation, and succession planning. In addition, functions such as communications, facilities, public relations and related areas may fall within the scope of the CHRO role. Increasingly, CHROs report directly to chief executive officers and are members of the most senior-level committees of a company (e.g., executive committee or office of the CEO).

== Evolution of the profession ==
The role of the CHRO has evolved rapidly to meet the human capital needs of organizations operating across multiple regulatory and labor environments. Whereas CHROs once focused on organizations human resources in just one or two countries, today many oversee complex networks of employees on more than one continent and implement workforce development strategies on a global scale. CHROs are especially important now in helping companies navigate the workforce issues associated with expanding into emerging markets, and in developing labor policies to suit different regions of the world while preserving a company's core culture.

The strategic role of the CHRO has also expanded as workforces are increasingly composed of knowledge workers, and companies require better systems to compete for scarce high-skilled workers. Rather than focusing exclusively on human resource issues and service delivery, CHROs must concentrate on creating strong talent pipelines to both enhance organizational decision-making and secure future growth. These changes in the business landscape have required the CHRO to heighten the focus on talent, capabilities and company culture.

== Responsibilities ==
According to an annual survey conducted by the largest industry group for CHROs, the HR Policy Association in the United States, top CHRO concerns over the years fall roughly into three broad categories: talent, capabilities, and culture.

=== Talent ===
Talent management includes building the quality and depth of talent, including a focus on succession and leadership/employee development. In a separate survey of over 200 U.S. and European CHROs, University of South Carolina professor Patrick Wright found that nearly all participants cited 'talent' as the top priority on their CEO's agenda for HR.

=== Capabilities ===
Managing corporate capabilities includes dealing with rapid changes in technology, globalization, and the increasingly complex external context of government regulations and public policy (impacting union and employee relations, executive compensation, health care, retirement programs, health and safety, etc.).

The key capabilities required are expected to vary by company based on business strategy and the competitive global environment. Adapting to new technologies and sources of information and communications are essential to success for all companies. Other capabilities the HR function must help the company develop include: managing the external context, managing a multi-generational workforce, adapting to change, and operating effectively in different cultures and business structures.

=== Culture ===
Cultural issues include organizational change, agility, social networking, ethics and values, innovation, customer focus, employee engagement, diversity and inclusiveness, and multiculturalism.

The human resources function has a leadership role in helping shape the culture of the company. Ensuring that the values of the company are communicated and understood at all levels, providing clarity as to the expected behavior of all employees and the development of a high performance culture are important aspects of the CHRO role. When an employee's behavior is inconsistent with the values of the company, the human resources function is responsible for ensuring that such situations are dealt with fairly. The HR function also helps the organization establish and maintain high levels of employee engagement and commitment.

Increasingly, companies are relying on external partners, joint-ventures, as well as merged and acquired companies as sources of innovation, capabilities and growth. Establishing a culture that is supportive of such external partnerships is an area where the HR function plays an important role.

Summarizing the findings of a recent study of HR leaders, Randy MacDonald, former CHRO for IBM, indicated that the three key workforce gaps CHROs cite as the biggest opportunities for HR are:

- Cultivating creative leaders who can more nimbly lead in complex, global environments
- Mobilizing for greater speed and flexibility producing significantly greater capability to adjust underlying costs and faster ways to allocate talent
- Capitalizing on collective intelligence through much more effective collaboration across increasingly global teams.

== Path to becoming a CHRO ==
The CHRO is the top HR position, but those who attain this role arrive there by working in a variety of functions both within the HR function and other functional and leadership roles both inside their company and across industries and employers. In a 2011 survey of top HR leaders, roughly two-thirds of CHROs indicated they worked outside HR at some time in their career. There is also significant movement between companies with only 36% of US CHROs gaining their position through internal promotion. In terms of HR experience, one survey indicated that the most common area of functional experience for CHROs is talent management; the next most common experience is compensation and benefits, followed by organizational culture. Current CHROs have had broader functional experience in HR than their predecessors and are less likely to have had experience in labor relations than past CHROs.

== Job description ==
Two recently published books about the CHRO profession, The Talent Masters: Why Smart Leaders Put People Before Numbers, by Bill Conaty and Ram Charan; and The Chief Human Resource Officer, Defining the Role of Human Resource Leaders by Pat Wright, offer insights into the profession from its leading practitioners.

The perennial top priority for CHROs is talent management. In The Chief Human Resource Officer, Defining the Role of Human Resource Leaders, Eva Sage-Gavin, former CHRO for the Gap emphasizes this point saying, "... at the end of the day, you and your team are the experts at talent management and must be able to understand and identify good versus great talent… Identifying critical positions, the great attributes needed to fill them, and prioritizing recruiting strategies accordingly was the key to success, whether I was working with engineers, apparel designers, or international operations management." Kevin Cox, CHRO for American Express, argues that "Great CHROs (and great CEOs) understand that talent needs to be developed in thoughtful, but not incremental, ways. Getting the balance right between ‘stretch’ and ‘in over her head’ isn't easy, but it is vital to the success of a world-class talent strategy."

The CHRO helps the company build sustainable competitive advantage through the selection and development of top talent that possess capabilities that help differentiate the company from its competitors. Conaty and Charan emphasize this point in Talent Masters by noting that “Only one competency lasts. It is the ability to create a steady, self-renewing stream of leaders. Money is just a commodity. Talent supplies the edge. We can’t put it any better than Ron Nersesian, the head of Agilent Technologies’ Electronic Measurement Group: ‘Developing people’s talent is the whole of the company at the end of the day. Our products all are time- perishable. The only thing that stays is the institutional learning and the development of the skills and the capabilities that we have in our people.’”

Other leading CHROs emphasise additional aspects of HR leadership, such as delivering results with a global team – a major challenge identified by Hugh Mitchell, – and developing and communicating an employee value proposition that will differentiate the company in its efforts to attract and retain the caliber of talent needed to achieve its business objectives, as emphasized by Michael Davis, former CHRO for General Mills.
