= Employer branding =

Brand management applied to internal brand engagement

Employer brand is branding and marketing the entirety of the employment experience. It describes an employer's reputation as a place to work, and their employee value proposition, as opposed to the more general corporate brand reputation and value proposition to customers. The term was first used in the early 1990s, and has since become widely adopted by the global management community. Minchington describes employer brand as "the image of your organization as a 'great place to work' in the mind of current employees and key stakeholders in the external market (active and passive candidates, clients, customers and other key stakeholders). The art and science of employer branding is therefore concerned with the attraction, engagement and retention initiatives targeted at enhancing your company's employer brand."

Just as a customer brand proposition is used to define a product or service offer, an employer value proposition (also sometimes referred to as an employee value proposition) or EVP is used to define an organization's employment offering. Likewise the marketing disciplines associated with branding and brand management have been increasingly applied by the human resources and talent management community to attract, engage and retain talented candidates and employees, in the same way that marketing applies such tools to attracting and retaining clients, customers and consumers.

== Origin ==
The term "employer brand" was first publicly introduced to a management audience in 1990, and defined by Simon Barrow, chairman of People in Business, and Tim Ambler, Senior Fellow of London Business School, in the Journal of Brand Management in December 1996. This academic paper was the first published attempt to "test the application of brand management techniques to human resource management". Within this paper, Simon Barrow and Tim Ambler defined the employer brand as "the package of functional, economic and psychological benefits provided by employment, and identified with the employing company". By 2001, of 138 leading companies surveyed by the Conference Board in North America, 40% claimed to be actively engaged in some form of employer branding activity. In 2003, an employer brand survey conducted by the Economist among a global panel of readers revealed a 61% level of awareness of the term "employer brand" among HR professionals and 41% among non-HR professionals. The first book on the subject was published in 2005, and the second in 2006. In 2008, Jackie Orme, the Director General of the UK Chartered Institute of Personnel Directors confirmed the growing status of the discipline in her opening address to the CIPD annual conference, with the observation that: "When I started out in the profession, nobody talked about employer branding. Now it's absolutely integral to business strategy—resonating well beyond the doors of the HR department". Similar recognition of the growing importance of employer brand thinking and practice has also been recently in evidence in America, Australia, Asia, and Europe, with the publication of numerous books on the subject.

== Review Sites ==
Just as sites like Yelp and TripAdvisor have sprung up to review restaurants and hotels, there is a menagerie of websites dedicated to allowing current, past, and future employees to review employers.

While companies can encourage their employees to leave reviews, the reality is that many of these sites are populated by former employees who've had a bad experience. This is evidenced by the average Glassdoor rating of 3.3, whereas an Uber rating below 4.6 will result in a driver being let go. This difference is driven by everyone rating in the case of Uber, versus a more biased group reviewing employers.

Beyond encouraging employees to leave reviews, employers can also pay a fee to have sponsored profiles on each of these review sites which allows them to post job ads, and add employer branding related content, amongst other ways of controlling their profile.

== Employer Branding ROI ==
Similar to brand advertising, the return on investment from employer branding efforts can be hard to measure. Many companies struggle with ways to measure the money saved or earned from efforts such as creating a culture video, having a better career site, or developing talent pipelines.

The simplest ways of measuring a return on employer branding investment are:

1. Increased awareness that leads to more applicants, and tracking how these applicants translate to hires
2. Increased conversion rates of interested applicants after implementing employer branding tactics
3. Decreases in time to fill, and the progress this allows a business to make
4. Decreases in third party recruiter spend

Branding agency Chezz suggests that employer brand ROI should be based on a wider data set that also includes engagement with employer brand materials and loyalty to employer brand content, giving a richer overall picture.

== Employer Branding and Tools ==
There are now an emerging group of tools that can assist HR and Marketing teams in their employer branding efforts. Some of these tools were originally designed for marketing purposes. Others are existing HRTech that have evolved to have employer branding capabilities such as the newer generation of applicant tracking systems and job boards. There is also a small group of software providers that focuses explicitly on employer branding such.

== Employer brand management ==
Employer brand management expands the scope of this brand intervention beyond communication to incorporate every aspect of the employment experience, and the people management processes and practices (often referred to as "touch-points") that shape the perceptions of existing and prospective employees. In other words, employer brand management addresses the reality of the employment experience and not simply its presentation. By doing so it supports both external recruitment of the right kind of talent sought by an organization to achieve its goals, and the subsequent desire for effective employee engagement and employee retention.

== Employer brand proposition ==
As for consumer brands, most employer brand practitioners and authors argue that effective employer branding and brand management requires a clear Employer Brand proposition, or Employee value proposition. This serves to: define what the organization would most like to be associated with as an employer; highlight the attributes that differentiate the organization from other employers; and clarify the strengths, benefits and opportunities of the employment offer.

== Internal marketing ==
Internal marketing focuses on communicating the customer brand promise, and the attitudes and behaviours expected from employees to deliver on that promise. While it is clearly beneficial to the organization for employees to understand their role in delivering the customer brand promise, the effectiveness of internal marketing activities can often be short-lived if the brand values on which the service experience is founded are not experienced by the employees in their interactions with the organization. This is the gap that employer brand thinking and practice seeks to address with a more mutually beneficial employment deal or psychological contract.

== Brand-led culture change ==
Compared with the more typically customer centric focus of Internal marketing, internal branding / brand engagement takes a more 'inside-out', value-based approach to shaping employee perceptions and behaviours, following the lead of the 'Built to Last: Successful Habits of Visionary Companies' study published in the mid-1990s. This sought to demonstrate that companies with consistent, distinctive and deeply held values tended to outperform those companies with a less clear and articulated ethos. While brand-led culture change is often the stated desire of these programs their focus on communication-led, marketing methods (however, involving or experiential) has been prone to the same failings of conventional internal marketing. As Amazon.com's founder, Jeff Bezos, asserts: "One of [the] things you find in companies is that once a culture is formed it takes nuclear weaponry to change it". You cannot simply assert your way to a new culture, no more can you assert your way to a strong brand, it needs to be consistently and continuously shaped and managed, which is one of the primary reasons many organizations have turned from the short term engagement focus of internal branding initiatives to more long term focus of employer brand management.

== Use ==
Strategic in nature with a focus on the whole employee lifecycle from hire to retire, employer branding can also become a medium to hire. It can be used to hire through employee referral or referral recruitment.

Employer branding since its inception has become an important metric for companies and their employee value proposition. For instance, there is an annual World's Most Attractive Employers ranking established by employer branding company Universum which defines top 50 companies in the world by employer branding.
