= Employee Appreciation Day =

Holiday

- Observed by: United States, Canada
- Type: Secular
- Date: First Friday in March
- 2025 date: March 7
- 2026 date: March 6
- 2027 date: March 5
- 2028 date: March 3
- Frequency: annual

Employee Appreciation Day is an event, observed on the first Friday in March, meant for employers to give thanks or recognition to their employees. It was created by Bob Nelson who was a founding member of Recognition Professionals International in 1995, initially to celebrate the publication of his book 1,001 Ways to Reward Employees and to remind employers to thank their employees when they do good work. Dr. Bob did his doctoral dissertation on why managers do or do not recognize their employees and has since helped thousands of companies create a Culture of Recognition in their organization with significant impacts on employee retention, performance and the ability to attract talent.

Though the holiday is still gaining in adoption in the US and abroad, like Boss's Day, Employee Appreciation Day has become an opportunity for managers, company leadership, and HR to remember the importance of appreciating employees. Companies often celebrate by letting employees leave early, offering gifts, meals, events or special recognition for workers. Such publications as Inc. magazine, Forbes, and Boston.com, have written about the holiday to remind employers to recognize and reward employee effort and to offer tips on building a stronger corporate culture through appreciation.

Studies show that recognition and appreciation are growing in importance as drivers of employee happiness and engagement. Showing employees appreciation can result in a company's higher retention rate, not only increasing the productivity of employees but the company as a whole. This has resulted in more and more companies and organizations using the day to thank their employees.

== History ==
Employee Appreciation Day was created by Bob Nelson —a founding member of Recognition Professionals International) in 1995—initially to celebrate the publication of his book 1,001 Ways to Reward Employees and to remind managers everywhere of the importance of thanking their employees when they do good work.

Beginning in 1995, Nelson collaborated with his publishing company, Workman Publishing, to make the holiday appear prominently on workplace calendars. His book has subsequently sold over 2 million copies and has been translated into over 25 languages. In 2012 the book was revised and expanded and is now titled 1,501 Ways to Reward Employees.

== See also ==
- Employee Appreciation Day (Superstore)
- Employee recognition
- Labor Day
