= Pay bands =

Range of compensation given for certain roles

A pay band is a range of compensation set for specific job roles or classifications, typically defined by variables such as experience, seniority, job complexity, or geographic location.

Pay bands (sometimes also used as a broader term that encompasses several pay levels, ranges or grades) is a part of an organized salary compensation plan, program or system. In an organization that has defined jobs, pay bands are used to distinguish the level of compensation given to certain ranges of jobs to have fewer levels of pay, alternative career tracks other than management, and barriers to hierarchy to motivate unconventional career moves. For example, entry-level positions at a landscaping company might include truck drivers and laborers. Those jobs and those of similar levels of responsibility might all be included in a named or numbered pay band that prescribed a range of pay, (e.g. Band 1 = $10–17 per hour). The next level/classification of a group of similar jobs would include increased responsibility, and thus a higher pay band (e.g. Band 2 = $13–21 per hour).

Organizing pay structures in a pay band manner allows for overall control at the management level of an organization, while still giving some discretion for supervisors to reward good performance, and keeping within a reasonable compensation budget structure.

== History ==
The history of pay bands dates back to the beginning of employment and compensation. The amount of compensation for one's work is a question that many have tried to answer but have come short. In the United States the Classification Act of 1923 mandated that pay was based on performance not qualifications, a practice that made sense when the workforce was largely clerical. However, by the 1950s managers were complaining that the system was problematic for reasons of no competition, frustration and non-responsiveness. In April 2000, the United States General Accounting Office authorized Section 9509, which authorized the general workforce classification and pay. In detail, the term "broad-banded pay system" was clearly defined as any system for grouping positions for pay, job evaluation, and other purposes that is different from the system established under chapters 51 and 53 of title 5 as a result of combining grades and related ranges of pay into one or more occupational series.

=== Other types of pay structures ===
Organizations use a pay system for rewarding employees with compensation and allow easy and equitable management of remuneration. There are a number of pay structures that have been developed by different organizations.

==== Traditional structure ====
In this hierarchical model, salary increases are tied to promotions. Employees must advance to higher-level positions; often managerial, to receive higher compensation. While it ensures a clear progression, critics argue it discourages collaboration and innovation.

==== Pay for performance ====
Although the Pay-for-Performance System is "widely used" for its "positive effects" on employee production, findings of negative side effects like "dysfunctional competition" have left employers wondering if this plan should be adopted. Their reasoning in keeping this system in place is related to the need for "fair managerial control", a battle many managers are striving to win.

==== Broadbanding structure ====
Broadbanding uses the General Schedule (US civil service pay scale) that places families of occupations together. For example, Office Services, General Support, Analysis, Law Enforcement, Sciences, Health, etc. Movement to a different level is based on full-performance, expertise, or years of working in this position. This structure is used to classify work requirements rather than positions to get a higher pay.

== Process of changing a pay band ==
There are two ways an employee's pay band can be changed. If the job description correlates with the national profile for said job then their transition will go relatively smoothly. However, for more complex or newer jobs that do not have a national profile, their process becomes increasingly difficult. In some cases employees are required to fill out large amounts of paperwork and go to a formal job evaluation panel to discuss their positions responsibilities. This also means that once an employee goes through the process and gets placed in a new pay band, others in similar positions will likely be grouped together in the same pay band.

== Occupations using pay ranges ==
=== Nurses ===
When a new type of nurse was introduced in the United Kingdom in 2005 called a "Matron" nurse, the Royal College of Nurses, Community Practitioners and Health Visitors' Association (CPHVA) both agreed on what their pay band should be. However, existing nurses who were still stuck on an older pay band felt that this was neglecting their right to a raise and left them on the back burner. Despite district nurses concerns, the CPHVA continued with their plans on placing matron nurses on a higher pay band due to their large range of skills and complex responsibilities. Parish says in his portion of the Nursing Journal that "We will be looking for something that is a significant inducement to new recruits, one that will ensure qualified staff stay in the professions." Parish goes on to show that many of the nurses coming out of school choose to go into departments that are well compensated. This leaves portions of the nursing departments in hospitals all around the country with a shortage of employees in specialty departments like learning disability. Parish said that these understaffed areas are a real problem, one that needs to be fixed to ensure the quality of work in their area of concern. One of the ways to ensure the recruitment of nurses in fields that are understaffed is to raise the compensation of the job to be more competitive with the other subfields of nursing. NHS managers who receive very high salaries may have been manipulating their job evaluations to receive these high wages. NHS was asked by unions to re-evaluate the salaries of many top execs. RCN's Head of employment relations, Josie Owen, acknowledges that a "group of staff in the NHS has overplayed certain factors to get higher grades."

=== Teachers ===
According to the School Leadership Today article "Freedom in Teacher Performance Pay", teachers in America are one of the most underpaid and segregated fields. The editorial suggests that "It is vital that teachers can be paid more without having to leave the classroom. This will be particularly important to schools in the most disadvantaged areas as it will empower them to attract and recruit the best teachers." Oftentimes teachers that want to be paid more are pushed into primary and secondary administration, opposed to being chairs of departments like advanced educational opportunities like colleges. This causes teachers to be in rotation and can lead to many shortages of quality teachers actually in the classroom. The academic journal suggests that we should rely on a different pay band policy to keep teachers in the classroom to ensure quality of education while paying via performance of the teachers as well. Paying for performance does not entail how many students pass the standardized tests, move to the next grade; but rather a secondary tool of employee evaluation.

=== Bankers ===
In 2011, the Chairman of the United Kingdom Treasury Select Committee in wanted the Financial Services Authority to reveal the salary of bankers in Britain. This move was designed to break the deadlock on the City of London remuneration. Andrew Tyrie, who was the chairman of the Parliamentary Committee, demanded Sir David Walker's idea of bankers who receive over 1 million euro annually should have their wages revealed to the public. Bankers feared this would affect competitiveness within their industry. Andrew Tyrie assured that his plan could address any question about competitiveness.

Examples of employers using the pay band method of compensation include:

- The Commonwealth of Virginia
- Cornell University in New York
- The state of South Carolina
- MIT

== Workers' view ==
Corporation like Northern Telecom, General Electric, and Data General have adopted pay bands to promote teaming and lateral development to take away from hierarchical movement within the workplace. The issues employees have with pay bands are that they restricts promotions in the organizations, leading the employees to look at opportunities outside of their organization to move up to another pay range. Also, since pay bands motivate employees to move laterally, some question the purpose of another position that is still going to be with the same pay band.
