= Broadbanding =

Broadbanding is used by Payroll Departments in Human resource management.

== Broadbanding defined ==
Broadbanding is a job grading structure that falls between using spot salaries vs. many job grades to determine what to pay particular positions and incumbents within those positions. While broadbanding gives the organization using it some broad job classifications, it does not have as many distinct job grades as traditional salary structures do. Thus, broadbanding reduces the emphasis on 'status' or hierarchy and places more of an emphasis on lateral job movement within the company. In a broadbanding structure an employee can be more easily rewarded for lateral movement or skills development, whereas in traditional multiple grade salary structures pay progression happens primarily via job promotion. In this way, broadbanding is a more flexible pay system. This flexibility, however, can lead to internal pay relativity problems as there is not as much control over salary progression as there would be within a traditional multi-level grading job (structure).
