= Employee recognition =

Recognition of an employee by a supervisor

Employee recognition is the timely, informal or formal acknowledgement of a person's behavior, effort, or business result that supports the organization's goals and values, and exceeds their superior's normal expectations. Recognition has been held to be a constructive response and a judgment made about a person's contribution, reflecting not just work performance but also personal dedication and engagement on a regular or ad hoc basis, and expressed formally or informally, individually or collectively, privately or publicly, and monetarily or non-monetarily (Brun & Dugas, 2008).

== Theoretical foundation ==
The track of scientific research around employee recognition and motivation was constructed on the foundation of early theories of behavioral science and psychology. The earliest scientific papers on employee recognition have tended to draw upon a combination of needs-based motivation (for example, Herzberg 1966; Maslow 1943) theories and reinforcement theory (Mainly Pavlov 1902; B.F. Skinner 1938) as a foundation for the effects of employee recognition.

=== Needs-based motivation ===
Needs-based motivation theories are based on the argument that humans have basic drives that motivate them to behave in ways that help them fulfill those needs.

- Maslow's hierarchy of human needs: Maslow's model identifies five categories of needs: physiological, safety, belonging and love, esteem and self-actualization. These 'levels' of needs are arranged on the hierarchy in order of immediate effect on human development and subsequently, potency for influencing behavior. According to Maslow, individuals are never fully satisfied on any need level but once a class of needs is substantially met, it is no longer motivating for the individual. Human behavior is therefore presented as a rational activity directed at the satisfaction of successive levels of needs. Recognition schemes are based on the notion that individuals aim at the satisfaction of the esteem needs after fulfilling previous needs on the hierarchy. The esteem needs can be broken down into the need for self-esteem and the need for the esteem of others. The need for the esteem of others is required to be satisfied externally through status or prestige, recognition, and appreciation by others. The need for self-esteem is understood as the need to hold a high evaluation of oneself based upon real capacity, achievement, independence, and respect from others.
- Herzberg dual-level needs theory : During his research, Herzberg interviewed several hundred US professionals, asking them to name work experiences that made them feel "exceptionally good" about their jobs, as well as those that made them feel "exceptionally bad" about their jobs. After categorizing the responses, Herzberg found that factors that caused negative feelings were quite different from those that caused positive feelings. Respondents who felt good about their work cited factors that largely correspond with Maslow's needs, which are positioned higher on the hierarchy. This included achievement, recognition for achievement, the work itself, responsibility and growth or advancement. On the other hand, dissatisfied respondents tended to cite factors extrinsic to the job such as pay, working conditions, supervision, security, relationships with colleagues and company policies. Most of these factors correspond to Maslow's physiological and safety needs. Herzberg's findings led him to conclude that there exist two different spectrums: one set of 'hygiene' factors that make up a continuum from dissatisfaction to no dissatisfaction, and a second set of 'motivator' factors that make up a continuum from no satisfaction to satisfaction (Herzberg 1966). Recognition, according to Herzberg, is a motivator whilst monetary rewards such as pay are necessary to prevent dissatisfaction but don't promote job satisfaction and motivation.

=== Reinforcement theory ===
Reinforcement theory has its roots in the work of behavioral psychologists John Watson, Ivan Pavlov, E.L. Thorndike and B.F. Skinner. It argues that people can be conditioned through rewards, which can be intangible in nature, and punishments to repeat rewarded behaviors and cease unrewarded behaviors. Through this process of conditioning, an association is made between a behavior and the consequence for that behavior, either an incentive or a deterrent. The theory is based on Thorndike's (1911) law of effect, which states that people are likely to repeat behavior that produces a pleasurable outcome.

== Types of employee recognition programs ==
According to Punke (2013), recognition programs should be balanced between performance-based and value-based initiatives, but the programs should be composed of three methods: formal, informal and day-to-day recognition.

=== Day-to-day recognition ===
It is a type of recognition practices that are frequent (daily or weekly), low or no cost, often intangible and often reliant on interpersonal skills for positive feedback that can be given to all employees. According to Harrison (2005), the day-to-day recognition brings the benefit of immediate and powerful reinforcement of desired behavior and sets an example to other employees of desired behavior that aligns with organizational objectives. To him, it gives individuals and teams at all levels the opportunity to recognize good work by other employees and teams, and it also gives the opportunity for them to be recognized on the spot for their own good work.

== Types of employee recognition practices ==
In relation to employee recognition programs, there are four recognition practices: existential recognition, recognition of work practice, recognition of job dedication, and recognition of results. These four recognition practices recognize employees as full-fledged individuals as well as workers capable of being committed to their jobs by investing time and energy to perform duties competently and deliver concrete results (Amoatemaa & Kyeremeh, 2016). These practices use direct compensation to show acknowledgement and appreciation for employees.

=== Existential recognition ===
This recognition is focused on the individual and/or group. Through existential recognition, individuals are granted the right to voice their opinions about and influence decision-making, as well as the course of their own and the organization's actions (Brun & Dugas, 2008). A vertical interaction level example of this is authorizing flexible work schedules.

=== Recognition of work practice ===
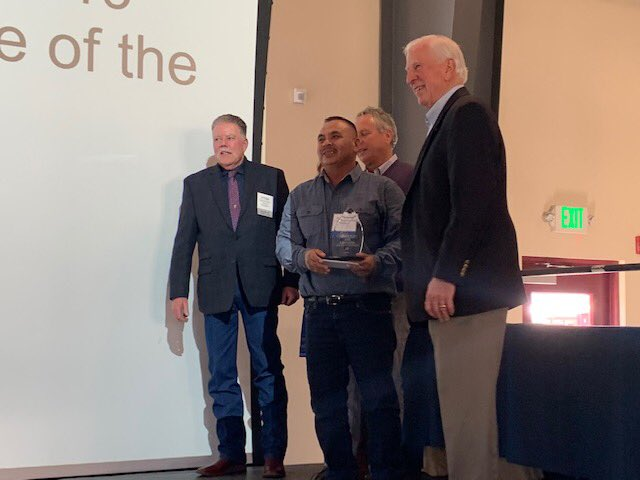
This shows employee recognition by granting awards.

This recognition focuses on the performance of employees job procedures, including their competencies and proficiencies. An organizational interaction level example of this is rewarding innovation by granting awards.

=== Recognition of job dedication ===
This recognition also involves the work process but focuses more on the involvement of employees either independently or within a team. This includes aspects such as contribution, commitment, and engagement. A horizontal interaction level example of this is a letter of thanks and/or acknowledgement from a manager to an employee for their dedication to a project.

=== Recognition of results ===
This recognition focuses on the result/product of employee work in relation to the corporation's objectives/goals. As an expression of judgment, appreciation and gratitude toward an individual or team, recognition of results is concerned primarily with the effectiveness, benefit and value of the work performed (Brun & Dugas, 2008). An organizational interaction level example of this is awarding bonuses as incentives to accomplish goals.

== Importance in countries ==
Countries value employee recognition to have importance in the organization, but how important it is will differ in the area. A survey in the Public Sector identified employee recognition in Canada values the ideal of having greater importance than in the United States. Statistics shown that 87% of Canadians believe that it is important, while only 78% of Americans believe that statement. However, the knowledge and communication of formal and informal recognition in the United States has higher percentage than Canadians. Formal recognition in the United States by managers has been communicated by 50% and informal recognition by 34%, while Canadian managers communicated 34% of formal recognition and 17% of informal recognition. The recognition is different, as different policies and legislation are being established, while some are already formed .

== Correlation between employee recognition and productivity ==
A case study from M-Nic Consultancy and Research Centre (M-Nic CRC) observed that the correlation between employee recognition and employee productivity are highly related. The results from the data presented showed that saying "thank you" can improve productivity by 82.9%. Praises of work can improve productivity by 88.8%. Offering simple gifts would improve productivity by 90.9%. Appreciation of work done improves the productivity by 86.4%, making the workplace exceptional would improve by 90% and providing flexible holiday schedules by 95.7%. The data of the relationship provided gives insight of how the two are connected in a business setting. Depending on the individual, the different kinds of recognition would be preferred over another.

== Benefits ==
Employee recognition has been identified to be a highly effective motivational instrument that can have significant positive impact on employee job satisfaction and performance as well as overall organisational performance (Rahim & Duad, 2013). When effective recognition is provided in the workplace, this contributes towards a favorable working environment, which can motivate employees to become committed to their work and excel in their performance. Highly motivated employees serve as the competitive advantage for an organisation because their performance leads an organization to well accomplishment of its goals and business strategy. By consistently and frequently applying formal, informal and everyday recognition programs, organisations are provided with a powerful tool for influencing employees to live the organisation's values and implement its focus (Herzberg, 1996 as cited in Luthans, 2000). It also affords the organisation opportunity to highlight desired actions and behavior thereby creating role models for other employees (Silverman, 2004). By specifically reinforcing expected behavior, organisations not only indicate to employees that their efforts are noticed and appreciated but also inculcate in them the organisational values, goals, objectives, priorities and their role in achieving them. As a motivational tool, employee recognition programs assist employees to see how they contribute to bottom-line results and how their contributions will be recognized and rewarded immediately. In any case formal, informal and every day recognition programs are able to satisfy both employees' and employers' needs as well as bring the maximum result and function for organizations.

== Consequences ==
Employee recognition is mainly perceived as having a positive impacts towards the business. However, there are some negative impacts like unfairness, favoritism, and bias. These effects can lead to poor performance and decrease employee productivity. Employees who receive the recognition may react differently, as they may be working too hard in comparison to the other workers. Other employees who do not receive recognition may feel neglected. Both of these scenarios may decrease the productivity in the workplace. These can damage the relationships from within the business. Another consequence that could arise is gender inequality in the workplace in regards to promotion. In Universities women are less likely to be promoted . . . as much as their male colleagues, or even get jobs in the first place (Savigny, 2014). This is an example of women being less recognized than men which may create feelings of mistreatment and lead to reduced productivity in female employees, ultimately resulting in lower job satisfaction and therefore lower job performance.

== See also ==
- Counterproductive work behavior
- Employee Appreciation Day
- Employee engagement
- Job satisfaction
- Occupational burnout
- Organizational citizenship behavior
- Organizational commitment
- Positive psychology in the workplace
- Work engagement
- Work motivation
- Work performance
