= Employee value proposition =

Concept of workforce planning

The employee value proposition (EVP) is a part of employer branding, in that it is one of the ways companies attract the skills and employees they desire and keep them engaged. It is how companies market themselves to prospective talent, and also how they retain that talent in a competitive job market. The EVP is meant to communicate the values and culture of the organization, as well as take the focus off remuneration as the sole reason for working there. The benefits, when done correctly, are a more committed, happier, and productive workforce at a cheaper cost, which are the main goals of any employee-centered strategy. It may also have the side benefit of improving the company's perception in the eyes of consumers.

== Descriptions ==
Minchington (2005) defines an employer value proposition (EVP) as a set of associations and offerings provided by an organization in return for the skills, capabilities and experiences an employee brings to the organization. The EVP is an employee-centered approach that is aligned to existing, integrated workforce planning strategies because it has been informed by existing employees and the external target audience. An EVP must be unique, relevant and compelling if it is to act as a key driver of talent attraction, engagement and retention.

DiVanna (2002) defined the employee value proposition (EVP) as the talent a company needs to exist to support the corporate value proposition. DiVanna (2003) later refines the definition of the EVP as a portfolio of skills and experiences which can be considered as Assets and incorporated into a company's balance sheet. DiVanna and Rogers (2005) provides additional clarity of the EVP as the value of the employee centers on the simple premise that an individual must be self-aware of their contribution to the firm under the present set of business conditions. More importantly, to keep the firm competitive, employees must also be cognizant of the firm's future directions and prepare to add value in new ways under a variety of emerging business conditions.

It has become closely related to the concept of employer branding, in terms of the term EVP being used to define the underlying 'offer' on which an organization's employer brand marketing and management activities are based. In this context, the EVP is often referred to as the Employer Brand Proposition.

Tandehill (2006) reinforces this link to employer branding, and urges all organizations to develop a statement of why the total work experience at their organization is superior to that at other organizations. The value proposition should identify the unique people policies, processes and programs that demonstrate the organization's commitment to i.e., employee growth, management development, ongoing employee recognition, community service, etc. Contained within the value proposition are the central reasons that people will choose to commit themselves to an organization. The EVP should be actively communicated in all recruitment efforts, and in letters offering employment, the EVP should take the focus away from compensation as the primary "offer".

Personal job satisfaction is driven by far more than financial factors such as salary and benefits. An organization's EVP has thus been described as "critical to attracting, retaining and engaging quality people". Other key factors influencing how an individual may choose to balance his or her career path in an organization are relocation services, salary, perquisites, career development, location, and so on.

An organization can benefit from an EVP because it can attract and retain key talent, helping to prioritize the human resources agenda, create a strong people brand, help re-engage a workforce, and reduce hire premiums.

== See also ==
- Employee recognition
