= Classroom =

Room designated for formal teaching

An elementary classroom, Alaska, United States

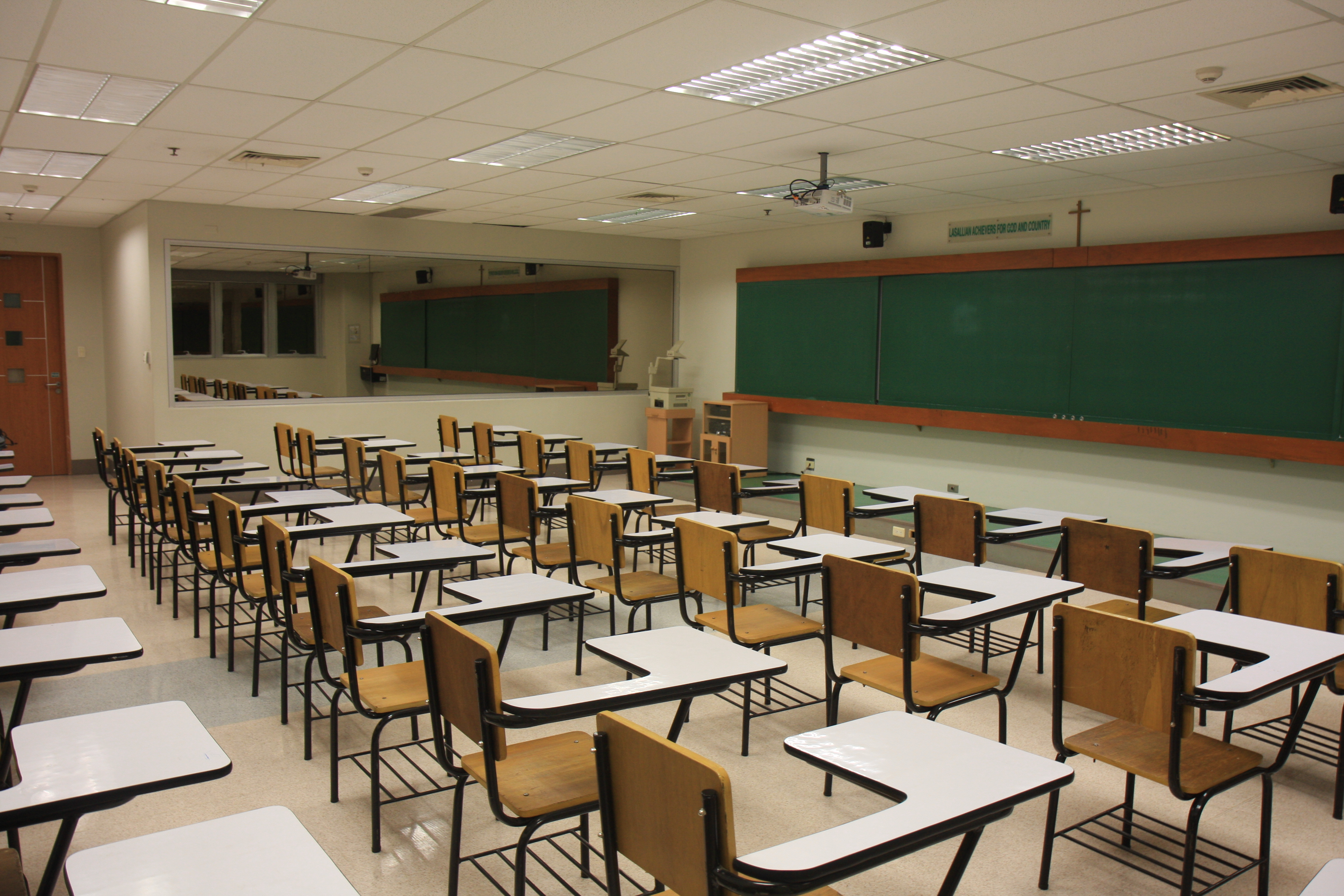
A classroom at the De La Salle University in Manila, Philippines

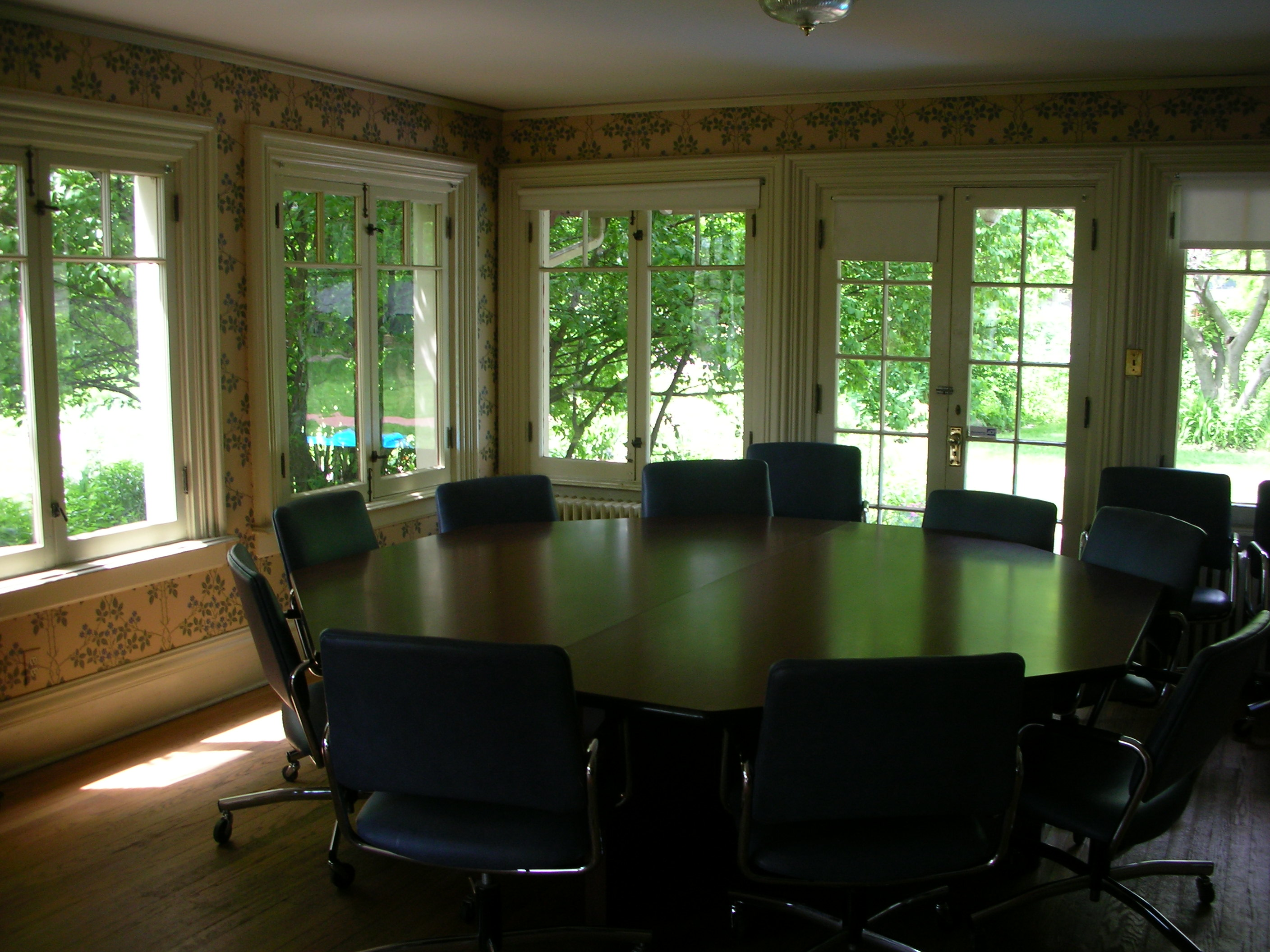
A classroom designed for dialogue at Shimer College, Naperville, United States

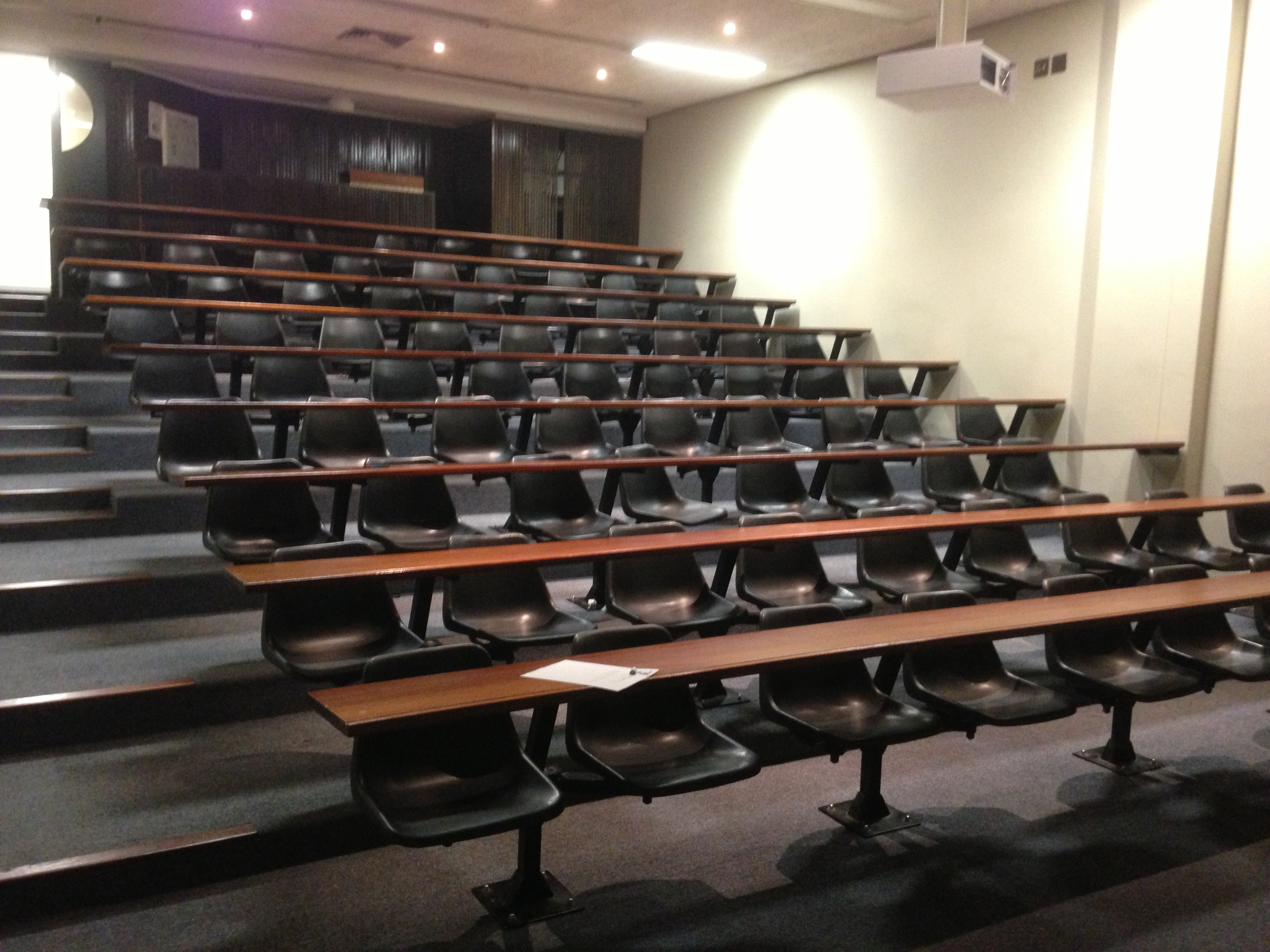
A lecture classroom at the University of Cape Town in South Africa.

A classroom, schoolroom or lecture room is a learning space in which both children and adults learn. Classrooms are found in educational institutions of all kinds, ranging from preschools to universities, and may also be found in other places where education or training is provided, such as corporations and religious and humanitarian organizations. The classroom provides a space where learning can take place uninterrupted by outside distractions.

== Types of classroom ==
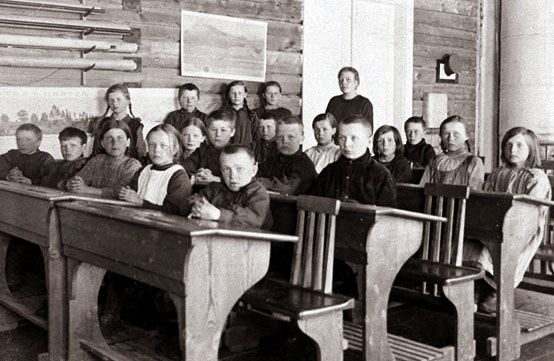
Children seated in a Finnish classroom at the school of Torvinen in Sodankylä, Finland, in the 1920s

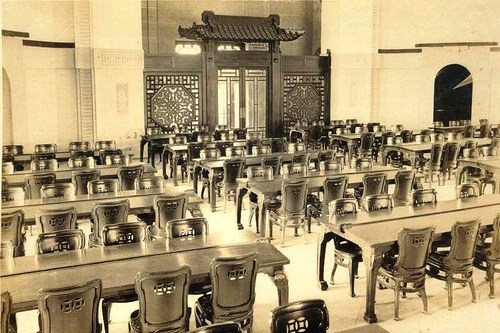
Classroom in Wuhan University, circa 1930

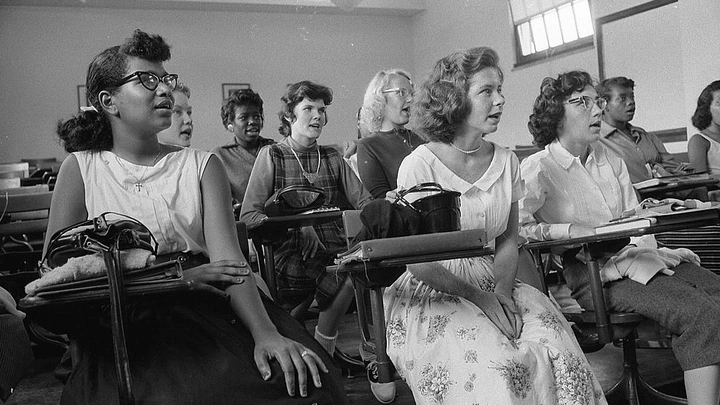
Students seated in a racially integrated U.S. classroom, circa 1957

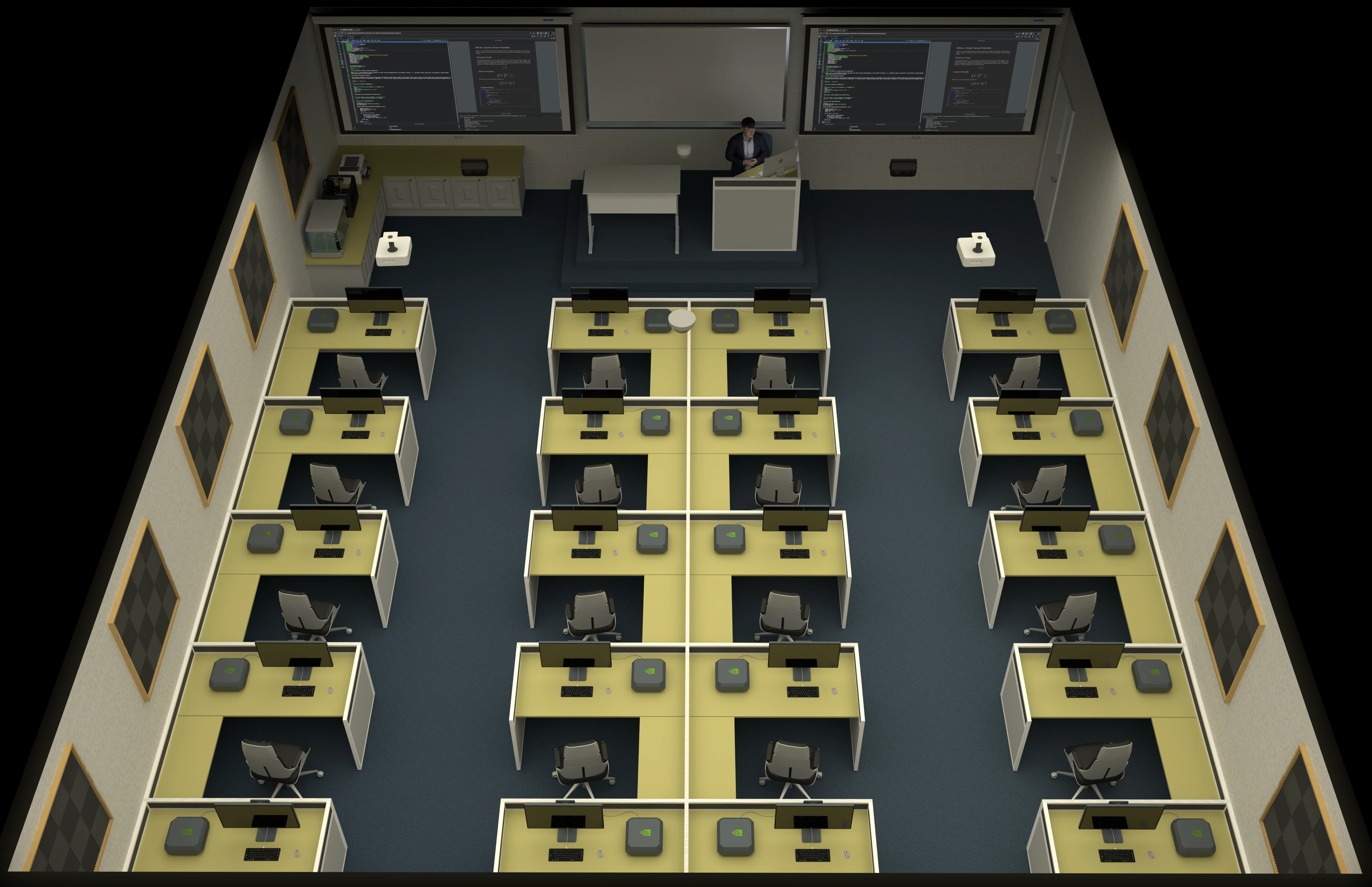
Digital carrel desk for computers in the classroom 3D sketch

In elementary schools (from Kindergarten through 5th grade), classrooms can have a whole group of 18 to 30 students (in some cases these numbers may differ) and one, two, or even three teachers. When there are two teachers in a classroom, one is the lead teacher and the other one is the assistant teacher. Or the second teacher might be a special education teacher. There may be a third teacher in the back watching and taking notes. In lower elementary the classrooms are set up slightly different from upper elementary. In these classrooms there are tables instead of desks, a rug with a (Smart Board) for whole group learning, a library, computers, and centers. The rug is the focal point of the classroom and everything else is strategically placed around it. The teacher must be able to move swiftly through the classroom. To determine if the classroom is meeting the highest level of quality there is a grading scale called ECERS (Early Childhood Environment Rating Scale). There are 43 items on this checklist and it is divided into seven categories and they are as follows: Space and Furnishings, Personal Care Routines, Language-Reasoning, Activities, Interactions, Program Structure, and Parents and Staff. In an upper elementary classroom students now use desks, there is no rug for whole group learning but there is a Smart Board and computers. Students also start practicing switching classes to get accustomed to middle and high, usually in fifth grade school transitions.

In a self-contained classroom, there are 7 or fewer students. Self-contained classrooms are designed for children that need more one-on-one time. Teachers get to solely focus on their small group of students and create individualized lessons for each child. An integrated or inclusion classroom can be thought of as a mix between a traditional classroom and a self-contained classroom. In this style of classroom, there is a mix of general students and students that need services. There are two teachers in this style of classroom, a general education teacher and special education teacher. They both teach and serve the students in the classroom, but during certain parts of the day the special education teacher may pull the students that have services to give them additional support. This allows students with accommodations or an Individual Education Program (IEP), to still get to be in a general classroom but also get the individualized instruction they need.

Middle school and high school classrooms are set up quite similar. There is one teacher and students transition from one classroom to the next. They do not stay in one classroom all day. These classrooms can have around 20 students. Students may not exactly have the same group of students in each class depending on the students' schedules.

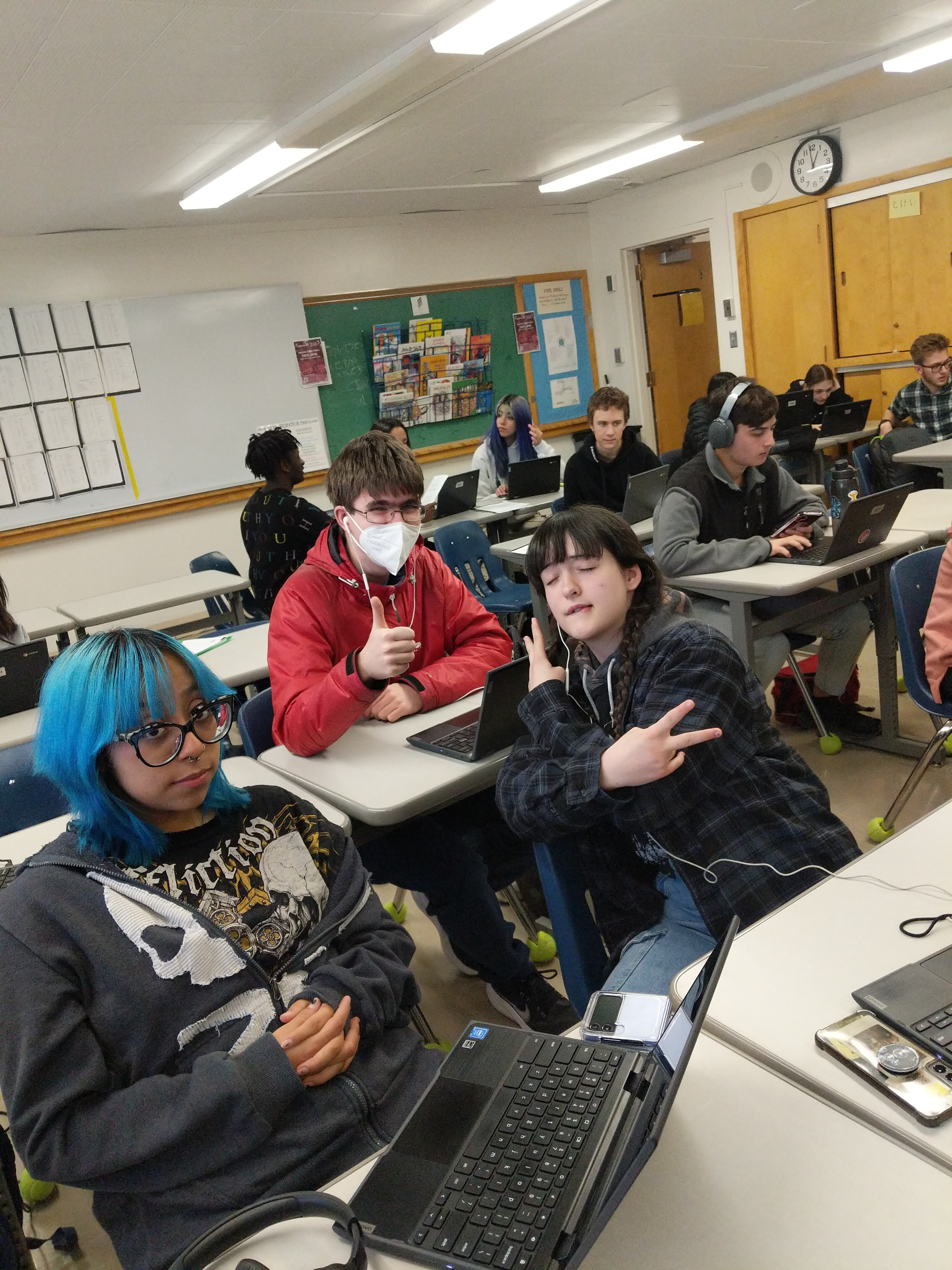
High school students in a modern classroom at Thomas Jefferson High School in Denver, Colorado, United States, circa 2023

Then college classrooms are set up in a lecture hall or auditorium with one teacher, also called a professor. Typically this teacher has a Teacher Assistant (TA), which is a grad student. This person may help administer or grade tests. They can also hold review sessions for college students to come to once or twice a week.

Some other types of classrooms that a middle/high school or college might have include computer labs for IT lessons, gymnasiums for sports, and science laboratories for biology, chemistry and physics.

== Decor and design ==
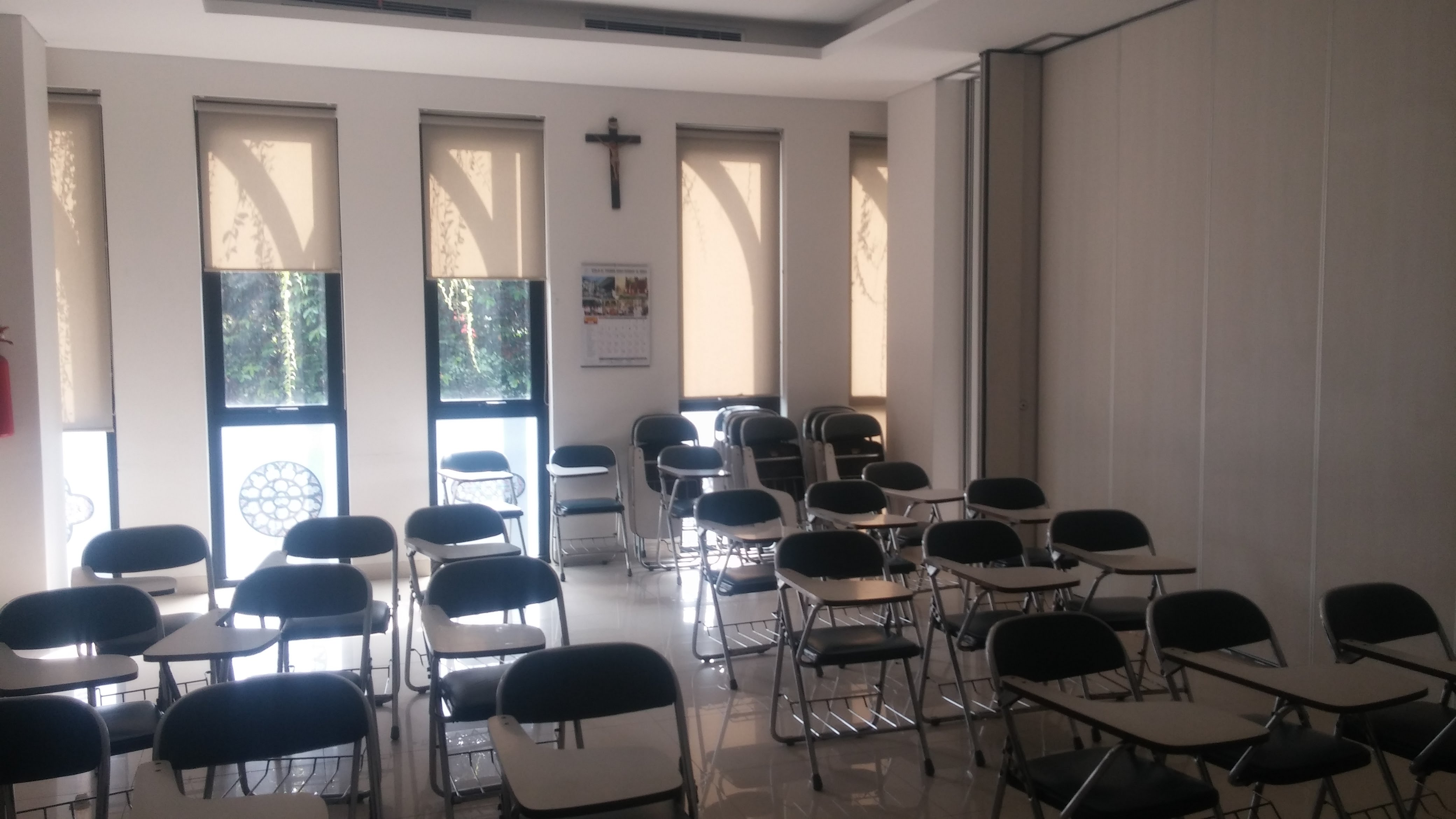
A classroom at Jakarta Cathedral, Indonesia for religious education/purposes used by catechumens

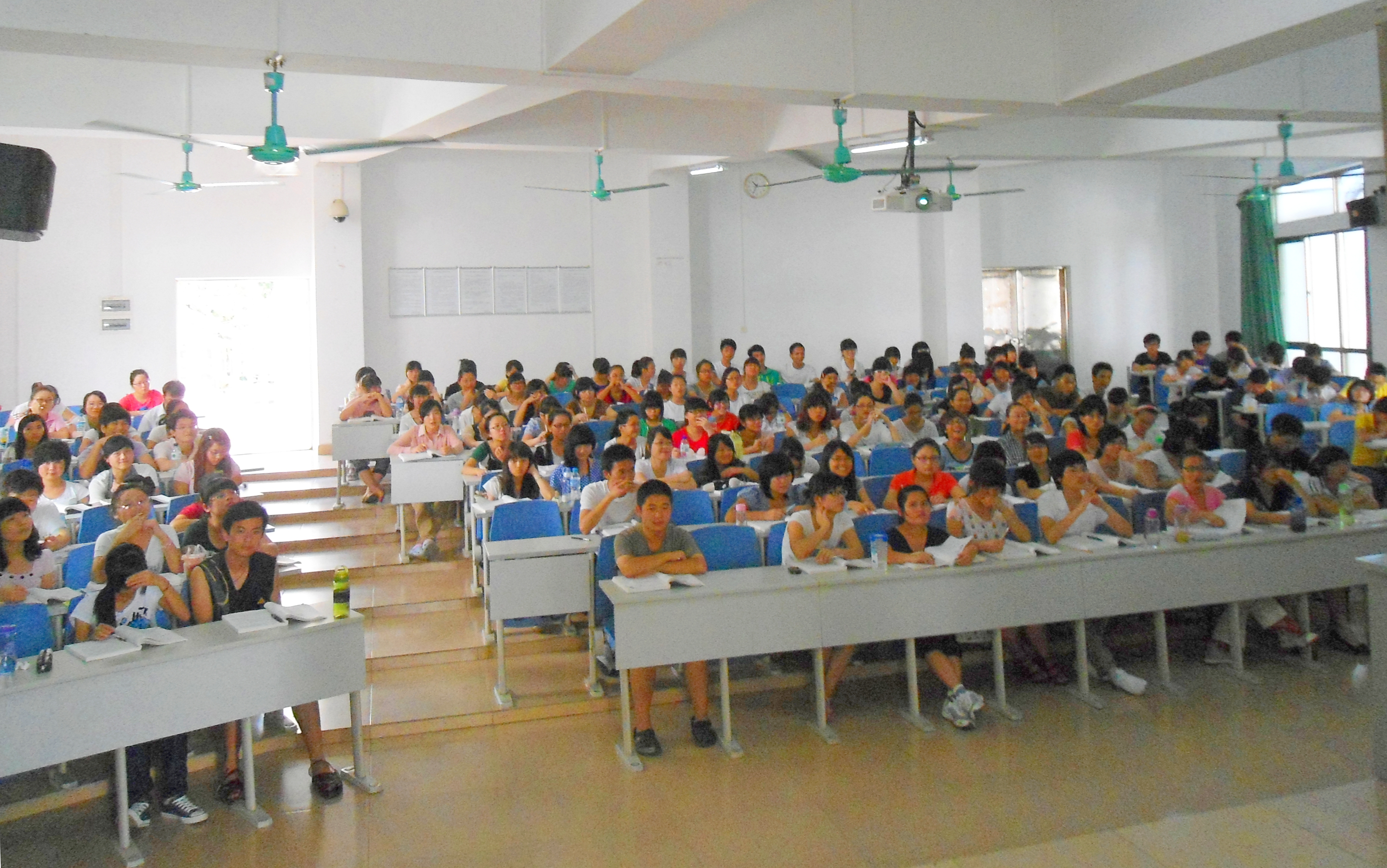
A classroom at Hainan Medical College, Haikou City, Hainan, China.

The layout, design and decor of the classroom has a significant effect upon the quality of the educational experience. Attention to the acoustics and colour scheme may reduce distractions and aid concentration. The lighting and furniture likewise influence factors such as student attention span.

Historically, relatively few pupil-centric design principles were used in the construction of classrooms. In 19th century Britain, one of the few common considerations was to try to orient new buildings so the class windows faced north as much as possible, while avoiding west or southern facing windows, as in Britain northern light causes less glare. Desks were often arranged in columns and rows, with a teacher's desk at the front, where she/he would stand and lecture the class. Little colors were used to avoid distracting the children. In the 1950s and 60s, cheap and harsh fluorescent lights were sometimes used, which could cause eyestrain. Research has suggested that optimal use of daylight, acoustics, color selection and even the arrangement of the furniture in the classroom can affect pupils' academic success. Georgetown University found that test scores increased by 11% through the improvement of a classroom's physical environment.

In the design of a classroom, desk arrangements are essential to the decor and design of the classroom followed by seating arrangements for the students. Usually classroom desks are arranged in rows or columns, but there are many more ways to arrange the desks. For example, a circle can be made with the desks so that it is more of a group discussion. The desks can also be in a "U" shape for group discussions and easy access for the teacher. Another common principle is arrangement in 'clusters' or small groups, which usually improves interaction and participation in (small) group-processes. Color is also a big asset to the classroom by relating the colors to the subjects learned in the classroom to help the students learn. Color also helps the atmosphere be fun and exciting, and helps visual stimulation for the students.

=== Acoustics ===
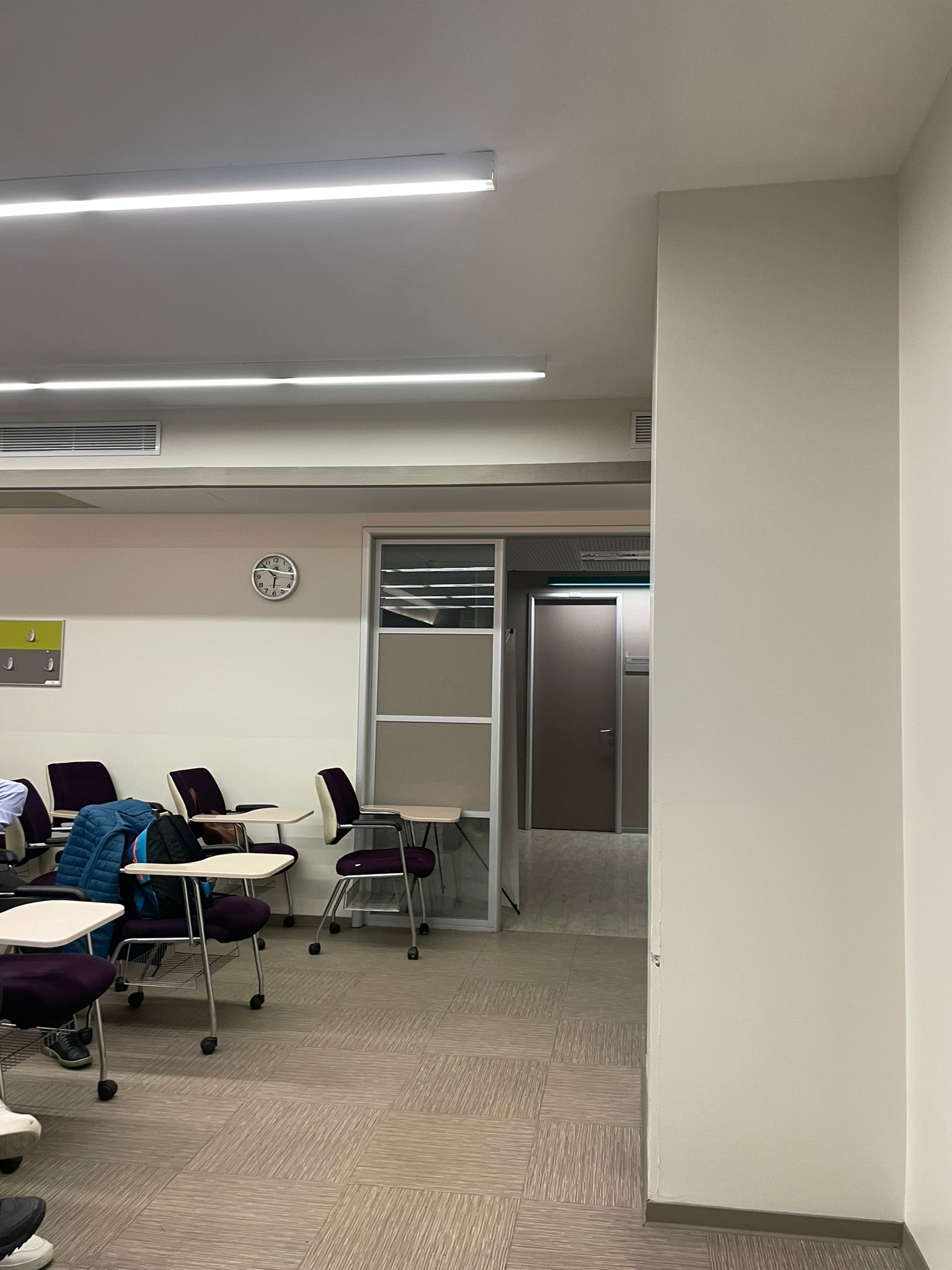
A classroom in Üsküdar University, Istanbul, Turkey

The acoustics of the classroom are very often overlooked, but are an important part of the success of a child. Choosing only materials that cause sound to reverberate, such as tile floors and hard wall surfaces, greatly increases noise levels and can prove detrimental to learning. One study of hyperactive versus control groups of children found that white noise has no impact on either group, but that auditory stimulation such as distant conversations or music has a negative effect on both groups of students. Children with attention deficit disorder scored higher on tests when white noise was being pumped into the classroom than when music was played. The control group of children as well as the hyperactive group of children averaged the same test scores when there was no sound as when white noise was being played.

By utilizing soft surfaces, especially on the floor, the sounds within and outside of the classroom will be diminished, taking away from the distractions facing students and improving not just the test scores of hyperactive children, but those without attention deficit disorder as well. Although carpet is an obvious choice for sound absorption, it may not be suitable for high traffic areas like hallways. In such cases, other sound absorbing materials, such as cork, can be used. The use of sound absorbing ceiling tiles may also be a wise choice for areas where carpet cannot be used for practical purposes.

=== Color selection ===
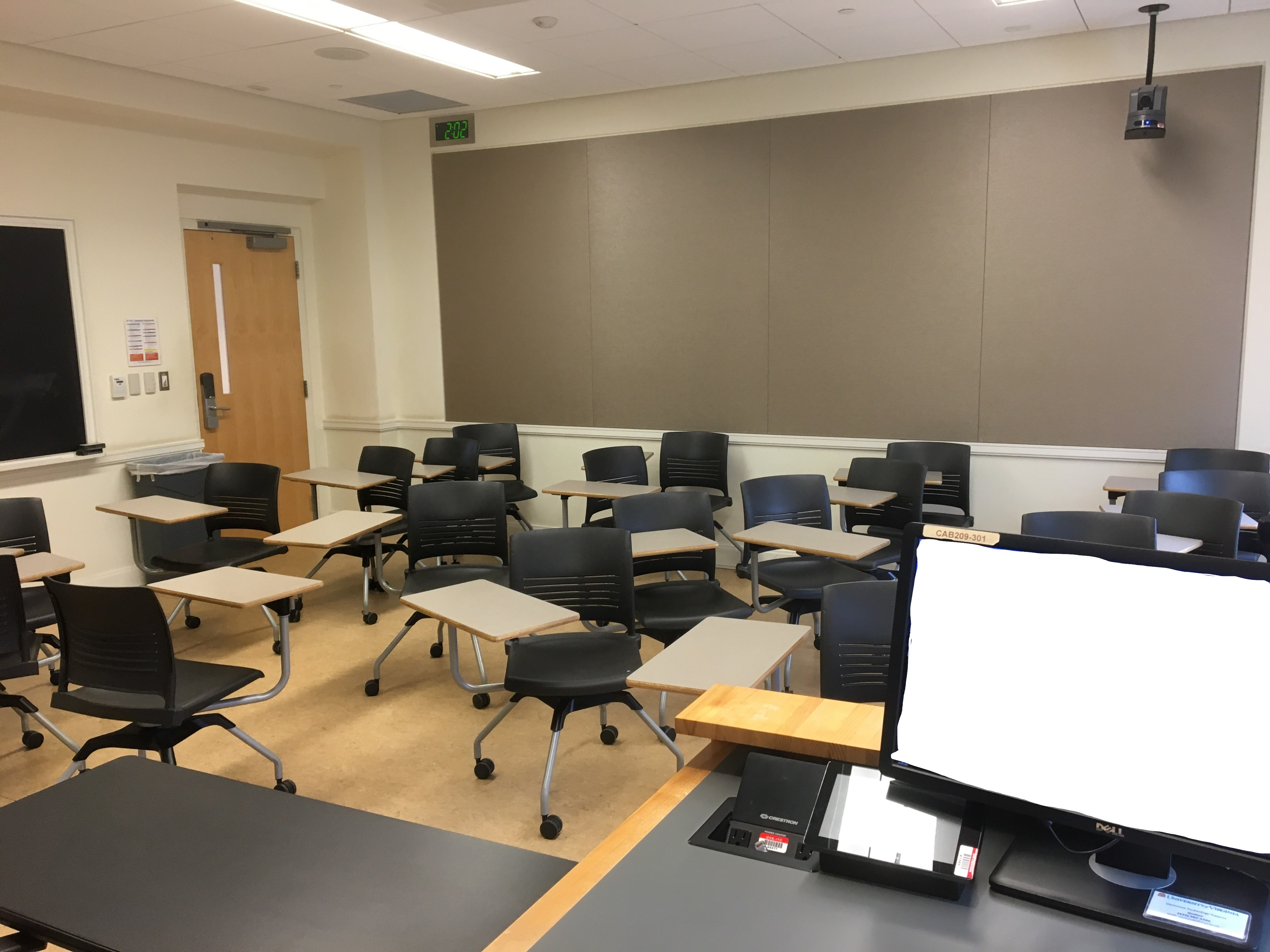
A classroom in the University of Virginia's New Cabell Hall, featuring white, gray, yellow, and black as its dominant colors.

Color theory refers to the effects color has on the human body. Red is said to increase both aggression and appetite, a poor combination for a school's interior. Yellow increases adrenaline levels and is also undesirable for a school setting. Blue, green, and brown create a relaxing and calming environment, which is a positive for the classroom. However, blue also is associated with cold and sadness and elongates the sense of time, which would make a blue classroom tortuous for students (Vodvarka, 1999). Warm colors are often favored by students, making them more alert and increasing brain activity, which helps in increasing test scores. Cool colors had the opposite effect. By balancing warm and cool colors, bright and subdued, a pleasing effect can be achieved that will reduce absenteeism in schools and keep the students focused on what the teacher is saying. Test scores go up when children are not in a stark white environment, which can feel sterile and cold.

=== Classroom arrangement ===
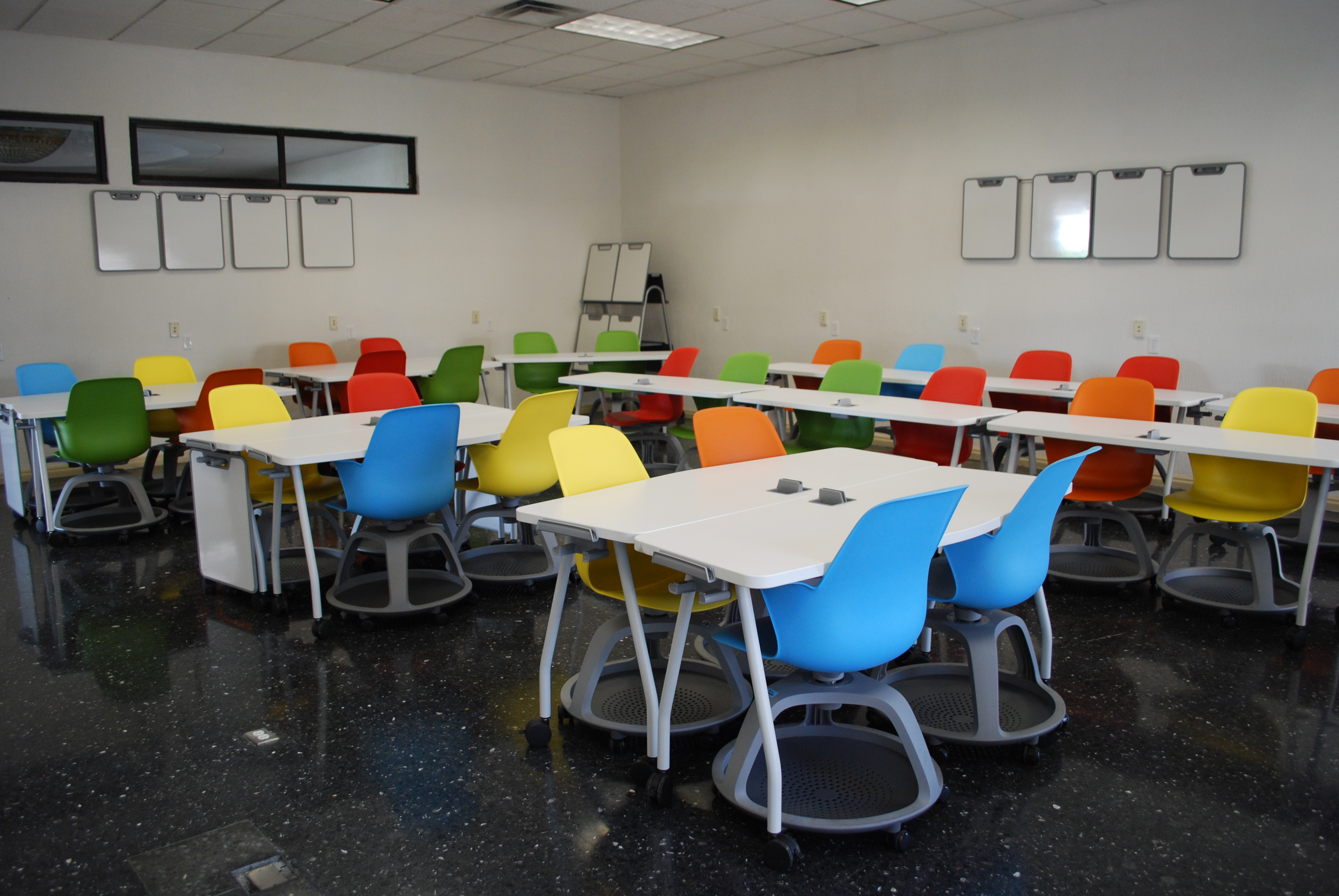
Redesigned classroom with moveable furniture at Monterrey Institute of Technology and Higher Education, Mexico City

Classroom arrangement or the arrangement of furniture is an important aspect because students spend most of their time seated in the classroom. The furniture should be able to move and easy to arrange to allow students to sit in places that are best suited for their learning styles so they can focus on work

Traditionally, classrooms have had one setup: straight rows of desks facing the front of the classroom. The row style allows teachers ample amount of space to walk around. This makes it easier for teachers to supervise the students work and catch any students that may be misbehaving, insuring that students stay focused. Studies have found that the row style also fosters less off topic talking causing the atmosphere to be more conducive to learning. While the row style sounds ideal from a teacher's standpoint it can be damaging to the student's well-being. The row style of desk arrangement has been found to cause the students to withdraw.

An alternative to the traditional row style desk pavement is to arrange the desks in groups. Phil Beadle, a UK Secondary Teacher of the Year, believes that it is best to arrange the desks in groups of six desks if at all possible. This allows for the most use out of the desk arrangement as you have the ability to utilize groups of two, three, or six students without moving a single chair. Beadle is not the only teacher to swear by group desk arrangement; studies have shown that the group desk placement setup produces a greater number of on task actions than any other form of desk placement. The group setup does have one potentially serious negative side effect. Students sitting in group desk placements are more likely to misbehave when the teacher is not looking, like using iPads that are provided by the school, such as in the Cupertino Union School District. To avoid this the groups of desks should be arranged around the outside of the room giving the teacher plenty of room to walk around and supervise as well as providing room for kinesthetic activities that can be beneficial to the students learning.

The final popular desk arrangement is the circle or semicircle placement. This particular desk setup is growing in popularity due to the numerous positive outcomes it provides. The circle desk arrangement facilitates the flow of ideas by fostering positive group dynamics. When sitting in a circle it is easier for students to not only see who is talking, but to make eye contact with the speaker. Students sitting in a circle arrangement tend to feel more comfortable speaking up and asking questions. This style of desk placement also makes it easier for teachers to control the class, preventing misbehaving and off task comments as it allows them to easily see all the students, and allows all the students to see the teacher. Besides, the type of furniture may play an important role in the learning space. There is a relationship between the ergonomic characteristics of the educational furniture and the number of cognitive errors: the more ergonomic characteristics of the furniture, the less error. There is also an error percentage reduction using separated chair and desk.

== Challenges to the classroom ==
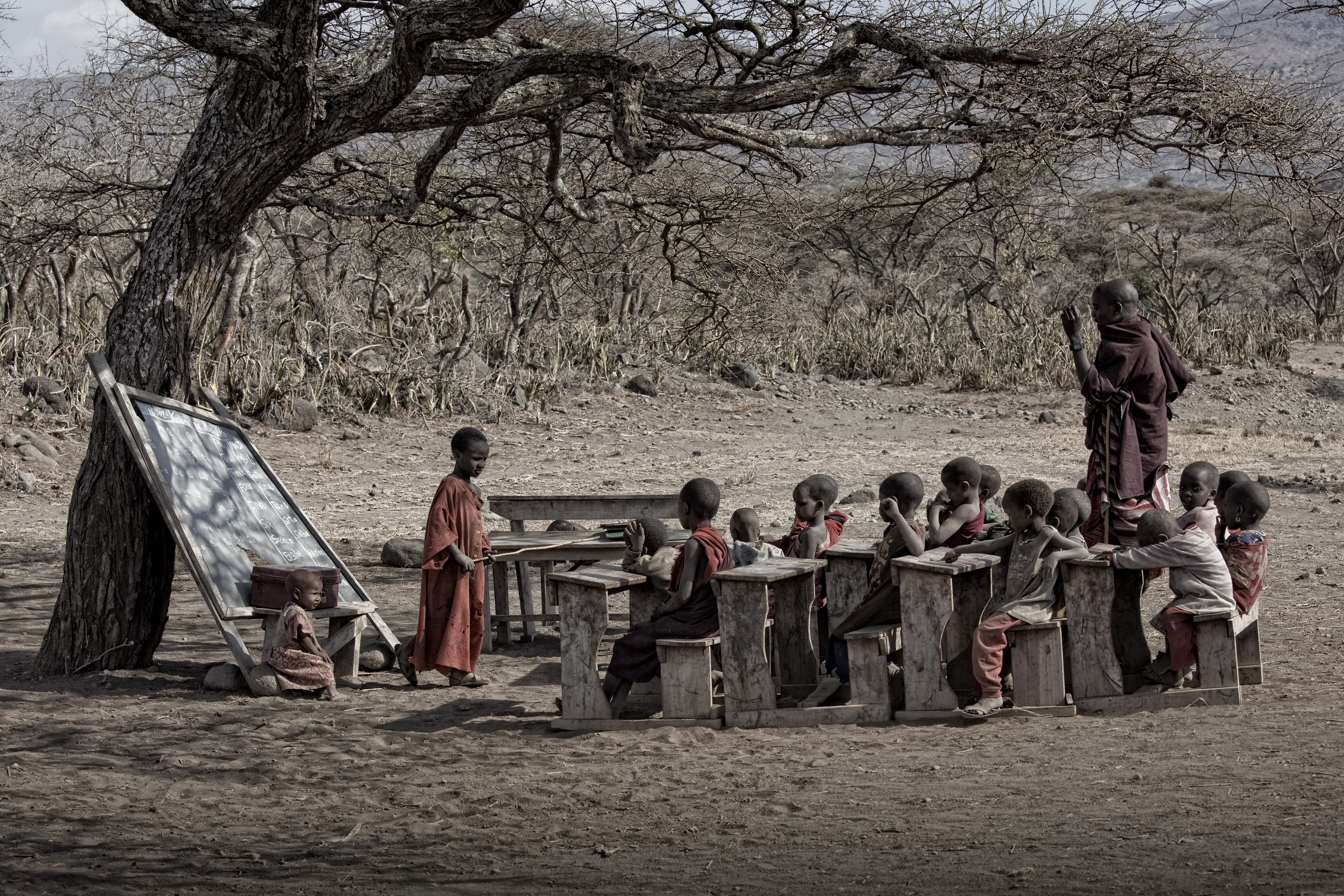
Open air classroom for Maasai children in Tanzania

Online learning technologies make it possible for learning to take place at any time, at any place, and at any pace that the learner desires. This is particularly important for adult students who may need to schedule their learning around work and parenting responsibilities. According to the American Society for Training and Development, as of 2014, approximately 25% of employee training hours take place online rather than in a classroom. However, critics argue that even the classroom space is full of distractions in the 21st century since even though access to the online world may be restricted by some institutions, students may find distractions in their physical vicinity and so tend to multitask and divide their attention without focusing on any one task at a time.

The traditional classroom has also been attacked by advocates of various forms of alternative education. Italian educator Maria Montessori wrote that "Stationary desks and chairs [are] proof that the principle of slavery still informs the school".

Low classroom air quality reduces learning.

== See also ==
- Classroom pet
- Factory model school
- Learning environment
