= List of human resource management associations =

This list of human resource management associations includes notable professional associations that either serve the broad scope of human resource management or a narrow scope within the field. Professional HR associations "aim to keep members informed, interconnected, and employed" by offering "member directories, publications, discussion groups, awards, local chapters, vendor relations, government lobbying, and job boards".

== Associations ==
Association Name	Acronym	Date of establishment	Based City/Country	Category
American Payroll Association	APA	1982	United States	Payroll
Association for Talent Development	ASTD ATD td.org	1943	United States	Training & Development
American Staffing Association	ASA	1966	Virginia, United States	Recruitment
Canadian Council of Human Resources Associations (CCHRA)	CCHRA, CHRP	1994	Canada	HR
Chartered Institute of Personnel and Development	CIPD	1913	United Kingdom	Omnibus HR
Federation of International Employers	FedEE, FII	1988	European Union	Employment law, labor relations
Human Resources Management Association of Chicago	HRMAC	1915	Illinois, United States	Omnibus HR
International Public Management Association for Human Resources	IPMA-HR	1906	United States	Public Sector
International Society for Performance Improvement	ISPI	1962	United States	Training & Development, Industrial and organizational psychology, Training
Labor and Employment Relations Association	LERA	1947	United States	Omnibus HR
National Institute of Personnel Management	NIPM	1980	Kolkata, India	Omnibus HR
Recognition Professionals International	RPI	1998	United States	Recognition
Society for Human Resource Management	SHRM	1948	United States	Omnibus HR
