= CHRP =

CHRP may refer to:

- Common Hardware Reference Platform
- Certified Human Resources Professional
- Trigeneration
