= National Knowledge Exam =

In Canada, the National Knowledge Exam (NKE) is a certifying exam administered by the Canadian Council of Human Resources Associations. It is the first step that an individual must take in order to obtain their Certified Human Resources Professional (CHRP) designation. The National Knowledge Exam is offered in the spring and fall of each year. The NKE exam consists of 150 multiple choice questions, which must be completed within a three-hour time frame. The passing grade for the NKE is 70 per cent. Candidates who obtain this standard or higher are then classified as "CHRP Candidates" and they are eligible to move on to the National Professional Practice Assessment (NPPA).

The NKE is designed to assess one’s understanding of the content in eight HR-related areas, or functional dimensions. Under these eight HR-related areas there are a number Required Professional Capabilities (RPCs) that the individual must be able to understand and apply. The eight HR-related areas are as follows:

- Professional Practice in Human Resources
- Organizational Effectiveness
- Staffing
- Employee and Labour Relations
- Total Compensation
- Organizational Learning, Development and Training
- Workplace Health and Safety
- Human Resource Information Management
