= National Professional Practice Assessment =

The National Professional Practice Assessment is no longer used to assess human resources experience.

== Description ==
In Canada, the Certified Human Resources Processional (CHRP) candidates are required to demonstrate three or more years of professional experience in human resources within the last ten years. The evaluation board determines whether HR experience is at the professional level, the following factors are taken into consideration:

• Independence of actions — relates to the amount of planning, self-direction, decision-making and autonomy involved in the work experience;

• A depth of work requirements — relates to the extent to which work experience requires data-gathering, analysis and interpretation;

• Level of interaction — relates to the degree to which the individual interacts with a broad spectrum of contacts, including decision-makers; and

• Responsibility for work outcome — relates to accuracy and extent to which the individual is held accountable for his/her work and decisions.

Junior levels in a human resources department performing administrative functions are not considered to be at the appropriate level; time spent in these positions will not be credited against the experience requirement.

The National Knowledge Exam (NKE) is a certifying exam administered by the Canadian Council of Human Resources Associations. It is the first step that an individual must take in order to obtain their Certified Human Resources Processional (CHRP) designation.

The National Professional Practice Assessment (NPPA) is the second and final exam that CHRP candidates must complete in order to obtain the Certified Human Resources Professional (CHRP) certification. The NPPA is offered in May and October each year. The passing grade for the NPPA is 70 per cent. Candidates achieving a passing grade will receive their CHRP designation. There is no limit to the number of times an individual can take the NPPA as long as it is within five years of the candidate successfully passing the National Knowledge Exam (NKE).

== Content ==
The NPPA assesses one's understanding of the Required Professional Capabilities (RPCs) as they relate to experiential knowledge. Experiential knowledge is implicit and much more difficult to quantify or describe effectively. It refers to the wisdom gained from experience and insight in applying academic knowledge to actual or simulated situations.

The NPPA questions are representative of content in eight functional dimensions of the RPCs, emphasis is more experience-based, or focused on the application of the knowledge.

The NPPA consists of 65 "critical incident" questions, which must be completed within a three and a half hour timeframe. The critical incident assessment provides the exam writer with a description of a practical situation that an HR professional may encounter. The exam writer is then asked to select from four possible answers the most effective action the HR professional should take to deal with the situation. Exam writers will obtain one point for each correct selection.
