= NPPA =

NPPA may refer to:

- National Pest Plant Accord, a 2001 agreement in New Zealand
- National Press Photographers Association, an American professional association
- National Professional Practice Assessment, an examination for Certified Human Resources Professionals
- NPPA (gene), which encodes atrial natriuretic peptide
- NPPA Journal, now Crime & Delinquency, an academic journal of criminology
