= Canadian Council of Human Resources Associations =

The Canadian Council of Human Resources Associations (CCHRA) is Canada's national human-resources body. It is responsible for establishing and maintaining national core standards for the human resources profession; fostering communication among participating associations; serving as the recognized resource on equivalency for human-resources qualifications across Canada and providing a national and international voice on human-resources issues.

== History ==
The CCHRA began in 1992 when several provincial associations recognized the need to collaborate on national issues and share information. They also saw the need for one organization to represent Canadian HR professionals to the Canadian federal government and coordinate the national CHRP certification (which had been adopted by several provinces). On September 15, 1994, representatives from across the country finalized the official constitution of the CCHRA. Two years later, Canada's national human-resources council was formally established as a collaborative effort of human-resources associations across Canada. As of 2011, the CCHRA represents more than 17,000 Certified Human Resource Professionals (CHRP) and 33,000 professionals.

== Certification ==
The Certified Human Resources Professional (CHRP) designation is a nationally recognized level of achievement within the field of human resources in Canada. The title represents a commitment to a national standard of excellence, sets a benchmark for the practice of adequate human resources, and emphasizes the strategic role of human resource management in business. By achieving the CHRP designation, HR professionals indicate they have a thorough understanding of the profession's body of knowledge in Canada, encompassed in the eight Required Professional Capabilities (RPCs). The RPCs are based on HR policies and practices in Canada.

To attain the CHRP designation, HR professionals must meet their provincial CHRP designation-granting HR association's requirements, pass the Canadian Council of Human Resources Association's (CCHRA) national exams—the National Knowledge Exam (NKE) and National Professional Practice Assessment (NPPA)—and sign the profession's National Code of Ethics. To maintain the designation, HR professionals must re-certify every three years and adhere to the Code of Ethics. As of 2011, more than 17,000 HR professionals across Canada have earned the designation.

National Knowledge Exam

The NKE, offered in the spring and fall each year, is the first examination an individual must take to obtain their CHRP designation. It consists of 150 multiple choice questions, which must be completed within three hours. The passing grade for the NKE is 70 percent. Candidates who obtain this grade or higher are classified as “CHRP Candidates” and are eligible to move on to the National Professional Practice Assessment (NPPA).

The examination assesses one's understanding of content in eight HR-related areas (or functional dimensions). Under these areas, there are several Required Professional Capabilities (RPCs) that the individual must be able to understand and apply. The eight HR-related areas for the NKE are:

- Professional Practice in Human Resources
- Organizational Effectiveness
- Staffing
- Total Compensation
- Workplace Health and Safety
- Employee and Labour Relations
- Human Resource Information Management
- Organizational Learning, Development and Training

Effective January 1, 2011, CHRP candidates must hold a bachelor's degree from an accredited college or university to register for the NPPA examination.

National Professional Practice Assessment

The NPPA is the second and final examination CHRP candidates must complete obtaining CHRP certification. The NPPA is also offered in the spring and fall of each year, and the passing grade is also 70 percent. Candidates achieving a passing grade will receive their CHRP designation. There is no limit to the number of times an individual may take the NPPA as long as it is within five years of completing the NKE. The NPPA assesses one's understanding of the Required Professional Capabilities (RPCs) as they relate to experiential knowledge. Experiential learning is implicit and more challenging to quantify or describe. It refers to knowledge gained from experience and insight in applying academic knowledge to actual (or simulated) situations.

The NPPA questions represent content in eight functional dimensions of the RPCs. Emphasis is more experience-based or focused on the application of knowledge. The eight practical dimensions for the NPPA are identical to those on the NKE. The NPPA consists of 40 “critical-incident” questions, which must be completed within three hours. The critical-incident assessment provides the examination writer with a description of a practical situation an HR professional may encounter. The exam writer is then asked to select (from four possible answers) the most effective action the HR professional should take to deal with the situation. The choices are graded on effectiveness: one response choice is optimal and worth five points if selected. The remaining responses are not optimal; some may be good, while others are poor choices and worth zero points if desired.

== See also ==
- Recognition Professionals International
