= Preschool =

Establishment for education of young children from about 2-6 years old

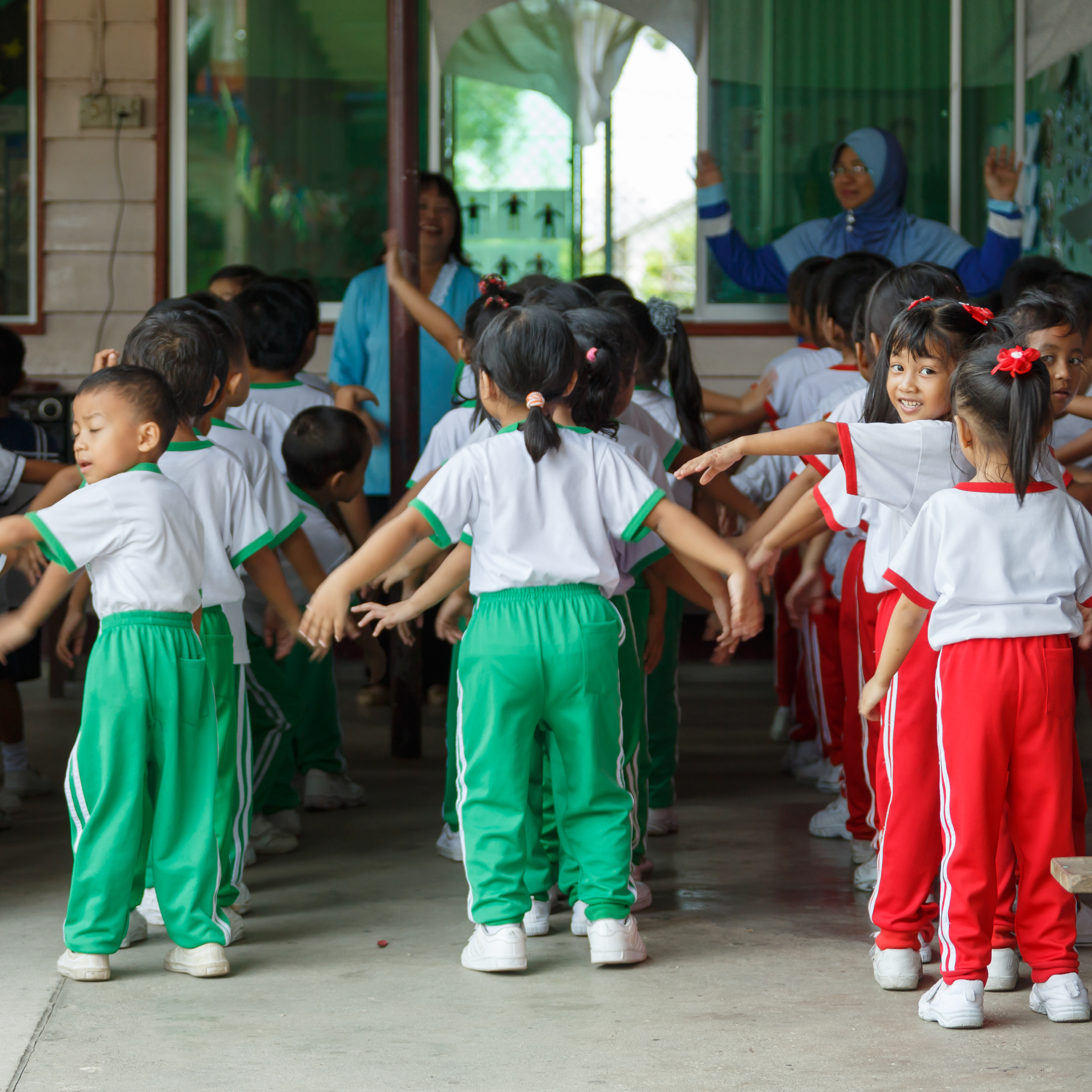
Preschoolers in Malaysia exercising

A preschool (sometimes spelled as pre school or pre-school), also known as pre-primary school, play school, or nursery school, is an educational establishment or learning space offering early childhood education to children before they begin compulsory education at primary school. It may be publicly or privately operated and may be subsidized from public funds. The typical age range for preschool in most countries is from 4 to 6 years (preschool to kindergarten).

== Terminology ==
Terminology varies by country. In some European countries the term "kindergarten" refers to formal education of children classified as ISCED level 0 – with one or several years of such education being compulsory – before children start primary school at ISCED level 1.

The following terms may be used for educational institutions for this age group:

- Pre-primary or creche from birth to 6 years old – is an educational childcare service a parent can enroll their child(ren) in before primary school. This can also be used to define services for children younger than kindergarten age, especially in countries where kindergarten is compulsory. The pre-primary program takes place in a nursery school.
- Nursery school (UK and US) from 0 months to 5 years old – is a pre-primary educational child care institution which includes Preschool.
- Daycare (US) from 0 months to 2½ years old – held in a Nursery School, but can also be called "a child care service" or a "crèche".
- Preschool (US and UK) from 2 to 5 years old – held in a Nursery School; readiness has to do with whether the child is on track developmentally, and potty training is a big factor, so a child can start as early as 2 years old. Preschool education is regarded by many as important and beneficial for any child as it may give the child opportunities for new social interactions. Through cognitive, psychosocial and physical development-based learning a child in preschool will learn about their environment and how to verbally communicate with others. Children who attend Preschool learn how the world around them works through play and communication.
- Pre-K (or Pre-Kindergarten) from 4 to 5 years old – held in Nursery School and is an initiative to improve access to pre-primary schools for children in the US. There is much more than teaching a child colors, numbers, shapes and so on.
- Kindergarten (US) from 5 to 6 years old – held in a Nursery School and/or some primary elementary schools; in many parts of world (less so in English speaking countries) it refers to the first stages of formal education.

== History ==
=== Origins ===
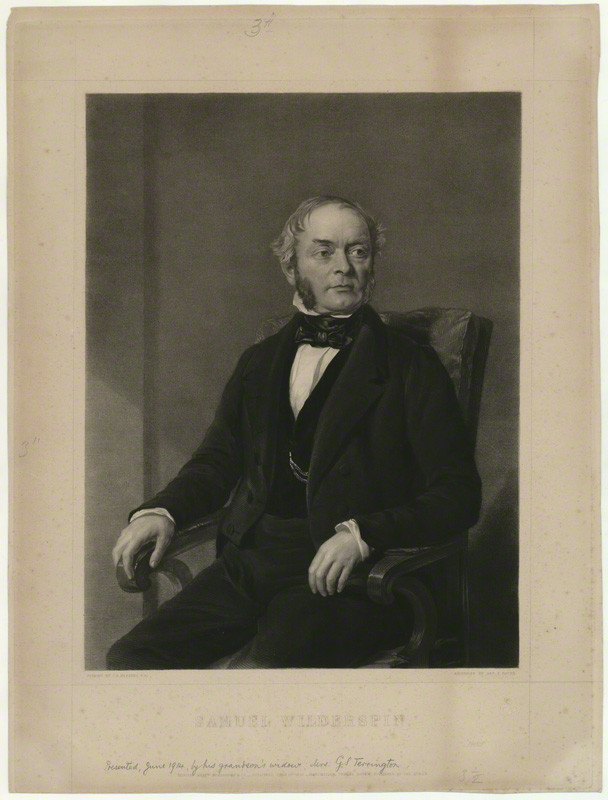
Samuel Wilderspin, one of the founders of preschool education. 1848 engraving by John Rogers Herbert.

In an age when school was restricted to children who had already learned to read and write at home, there were many attempts to make school accessible to orphans or to the children of women who worked in factories.

In 1779, Johann Friedrich Oberlin and Louise Scheppler founded in Strasbourg an early establishment for caring for and educating pre-school children whose parents were absent during the day. At about the same time, in 1780, similar infant establishments were established in Bavaria In 1802, Pauline zur Lippe established a preschool center in Detmold.

In 1816, Robert Owen, a philosopher and pedagogue, opened the first British and probably globally the first infant school in New Lanark, Scotland. In conjunction with his venture for cooperative mills Owen wanted the children to be given a good moral education so that they would be fit for work. His system was successful in producing obedient children with basic literacy and numeracy.

Samuel Wilderspin opened his first infant school in London in 1819, and went on to establish hundreds more. He published many works on the subject, and his work became the model for infant schools throughout England and further afield. Play was an important part of Wilderspin's system of education. He was recognized for inventing the playground. In 1823, Wilderspin published On the Importance of Educating the Infant Poor, based on the school. He began working for the Infant School Society the next year, informing others about his views. He also wrote "The Infant System, for developing the physical, intellectual, and moral powers off all children from one to seven years of age".

=== Spread ===
Countess Theresa Brunszvik (1775–1861), who had known and been influenced by Johann Heinrich Pestalozzi, was influenced by this example to open an Angyalkert ('angel garden' in Hungarian) on 27 May 1828 in her residence in Buda, the first of eleven care centers that she founded for young children. In 1836 she established an institute for the foundation of preschool centers. The idea became popular among the nobility and the middle class and was copied throughout the Hungarian kingdom.

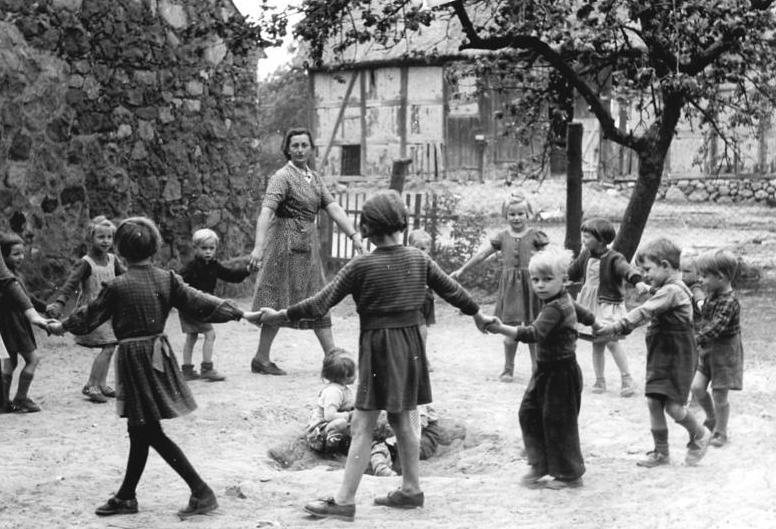
A Kindergarten in East Germany in 1956

Friedrich Fröbel (1782–1852) opened a Play and Activity institute in 1837 in the village of Bad Blankenburg in the principality of Schwarzburg-Rudolstadt, Thuringia, which he renamed Kindergarten on 28 June 1840. That same year the educator Emily Ronalds was the first British person to study his approach and Fröbel urged her to transplant his concepts in England.

Later, women trained by Fröbel opened Kindergartens throughout Europe and around the World. The First Kindergarten in the United States was founded in Watertown, Wisconsin in 1856 and was conducted in German. Elizabeth Peabody founded America's first English-language kindergarten in 1860 and the first free kindergarten in America was founded in 1870 by Conrad Poppenhusen, a German industrialist and philanthropist, who also established the Poppenhusen Institute and the first publicly financed kindergarten in the United States was established in St. Louis in 1873 by Susan Blow. Canada's first private kindergarten was opened by the Wesleyan Methodist Church in Charlottetown, Prince Edward Island in 1870 and by the end of the decade, they were common in large Canadian towns and cities. The country's first public-school kindergartens were established in Berlin, Ontario in 1882 at Central School. In 1885, the Toronto Normal School (teacher training) opened a department for Kindergarten teaching.

Elizabeth Harrison wrote extensively on the theory of early childhood education and worked to enhance educational standards for kindergarten teachers by establishing what became the National College of Education in 1886.

Head Start was the first publicly funded preschool program in the US, created in 1965 by President Johnson for low-income families—only 10% of children were then enrolled in preschool. Due to large demand, various states subsidized preschool for low-income families in the 1980s.

== Developmental areas ==
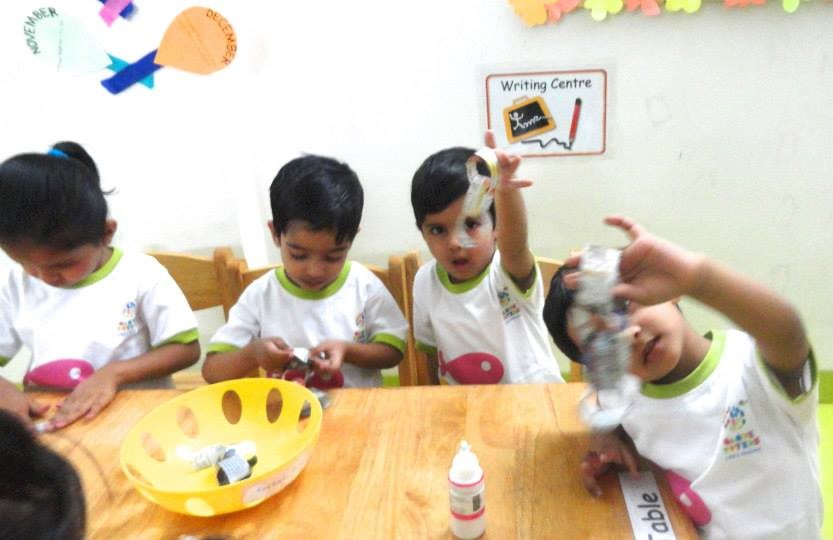
Crafts at an Indian preschool, 2014

The most important years of learning begin at birth. The first three years of a child's life are critical for setting the foundation for language acquisition, socialization, and attitudes to learning. During the early years and especially during the first 3 to 5 years, humans are capable of absorbing a lot of information. The brain grows most rapidly in the early years. High quality and well trained teachers and preschools with developmentally-appropriate programmes can have a long-term effect on improving learning outcomes for children. The effects tend to be more marked for disadvantaged students i.e. children coming from impoverished backgrounds with very little or no access to healthy food, socialization, books and play resources.

The areas of development that preschool education covers varies. However, the following main themes are typically offered.

- Personal, social and emotional development
- Communication, language, and literacy
- Mathematical development
- Knowledge and understanding of the world
- Physical development
- Creative, expressive, and aesthetic development

Preschool systems observe standards for structure (administration, class size, student–teacher ratio, services), process (quality of classroom environments, teacher-child interactions, etc.) and alignment (standards, curriculum, assessments) components. Curriculum is designed for differing ages. For example, counting to 10 is generally after the age of four.

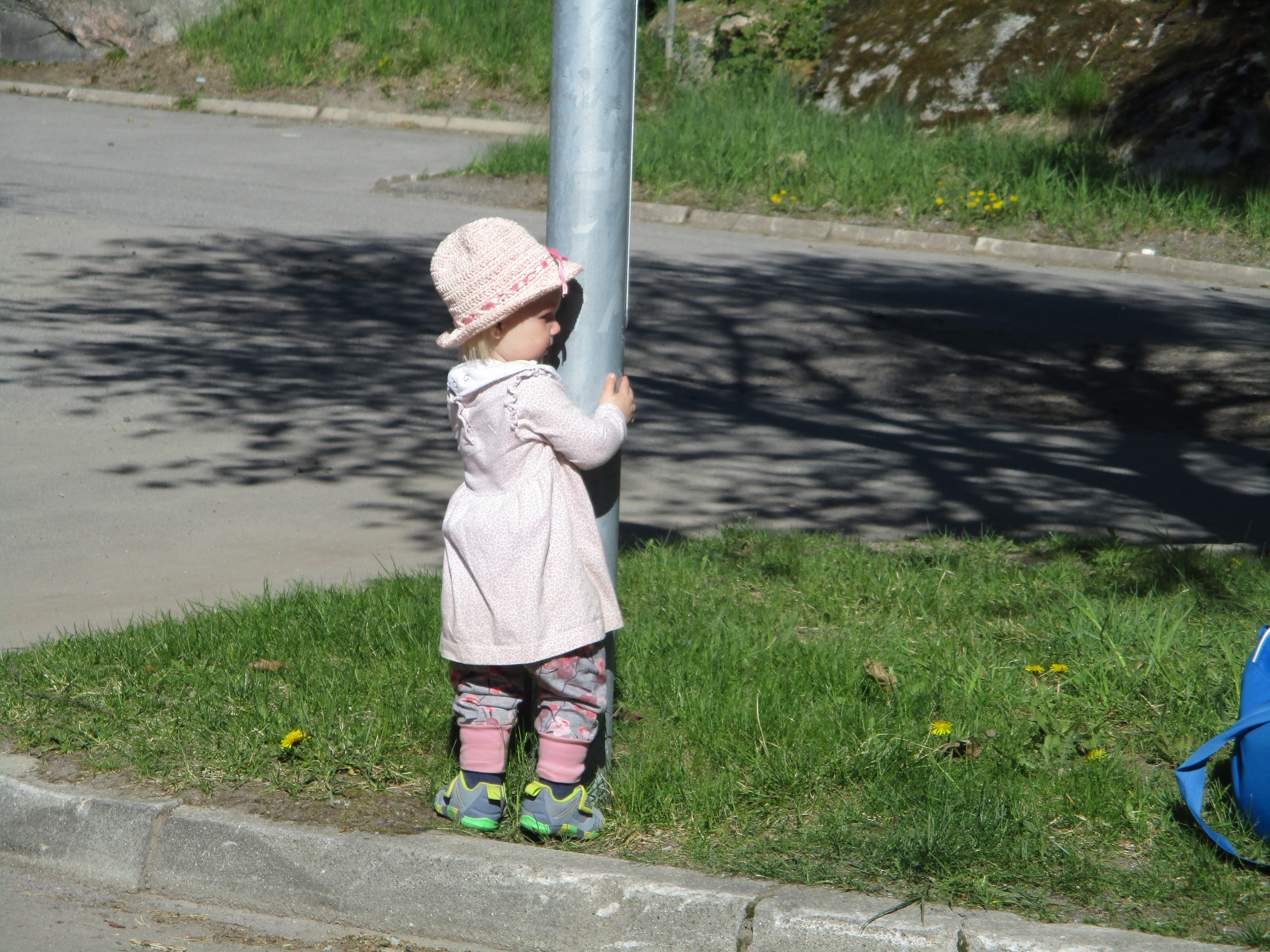
A 19-month-old girl after her first 9 hours at preschool

Some studies dispute the benefits of preschool education, finding that preschool can be detrimental to cognitive and social development. A study by UC Berkeley and Stanford University on 14,000 preschools revealed that while there is a temporary cognitive boost in pre-reading and math, preschool holds detrimental effects on social development and cooperation. Research has also shown that the home environment has a greater impact on future outcomes than preschool.

There is emerging evidence that high-quality preschools are "play based," rather than attempting to provide early formal instruction in academic subjects. "Playing with other children, away from adults, is how children learn to make their own decisions, control their emotions and impulses, see from others' perspectives, negotiate differences with others, and make friends," according to Peter Gray, a professor at Boston College and an expert on the evolution of play and its vital role in child development. "In short, play is how children learn to take control of their lives."

In 2022, 68% of 4-year-olds in the United States attended preschool, with 32% not participating.

Research by the American Psychological Association indicates that preschool attendees tend to achieve higher scores in cognitive and language assessments, demonstrating the positive impact of early education on intellectual development.

The Economic Policy Institute reports that pre-school programs provide long-term economic benefits; investments in preschool lead to higher earnings, increased tax revenues, and a reduction in social costs.

Preschools have adopted various methods of teaching, such as Montessori, Waldorf, Head Start, HighScope, Reggio Emilia approach, Bank Street and Forest kindergartens.

== Curriculum ==
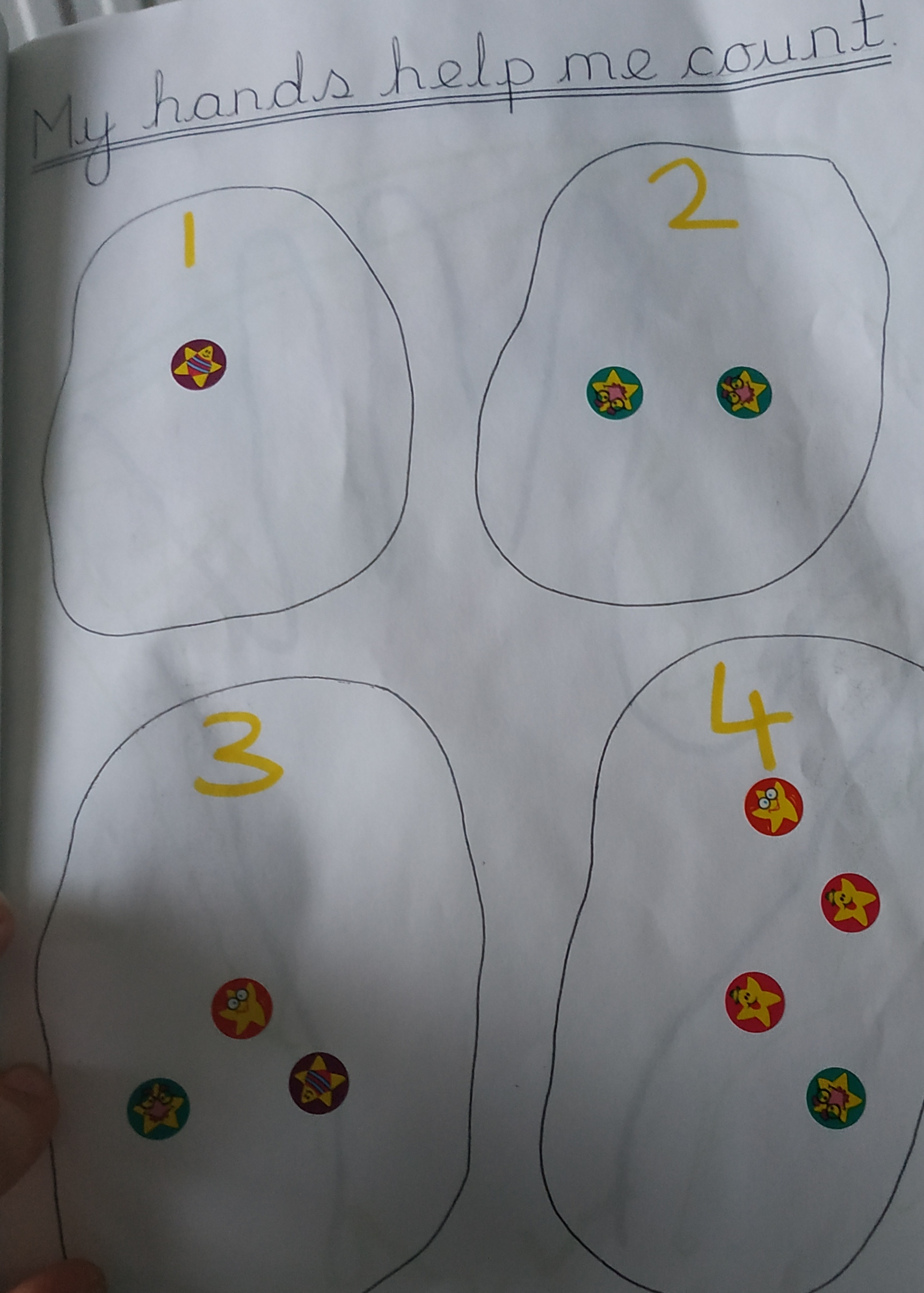
Numeracy task completed by a three-year-old at nursery in the United Kingdom during the 2000s

Curricula for preschool children have long been a hotbed for debate. Much of this revolves around content and pedagogy; the extent to which academic content should be included in the curriculum and whether formal instruction or child-initiated exploration, supported by adults, is more effective. Proponents of an academic curriculum are likely to favour a focus on basic skills, especially literacy and numeracy, and structured pre-determined activities for achieving related goals. Internationally, there is strong opposition to this type of early childhood care and education curriculum and defence of a broad-based curriculum that supports a child's overall development including health and physical development, emotional and spiritual wellbeing, social competence, intellectual development and communication skills. The type of document that emerges from this perspective is likely to be more open, offering a framework which teachers and parents can use to develop curricula specific to their contexts.

== National variations ==
Preschool education, like all other forms of education, is intended by the society that controls it to transmit important cultural values to the participants. As a result, different cultures make different choices about preschool education. Despite the variations, there are a few common themes. Most significantly, preschool is universally expected to increase the young child's ability to perform basic self-care tasks such as dressing, feeding, and toileting.

=== China ===
The study of early childhood education (ECE) in China has been intimately influenced by the reforms and progress of Chinese politics and the economy. Currently, the Chinese government has shown interest in early childhood education, implementing policies in the form of The Guidance for Kindergarten Education (Trial Version) in 2001 and The National Education Reform and Development of Long-Term planning Programs (2010–2020) in 2010. It has been found that China's kindergarten education has dramatically changed since 1990. In recent years, various Western curricula and pedagogical models have been introduced to China, such as Montessori programs, Reggio Emilia, Developmentally Appropriate Practice (DAP), and the Project Approach. Many kindergartens have faced difficulties and challenges in adapting these models in their programs. Therefore, a heated debate about how the Western curricula can be appropriated in the Chinese cultural context has been initiated between early childhood researchers and practitioners. Research has revealed that the most important aim for promoting curriculum reform is to improve kindergarten teachers' professional knowledge, such as their understanding of the concept of play and pedagogy, and perceptions of inclusion and kindergarten-based curriculum. Furthermore, within the process of reform, family education and family collaborations cannot be ignored in child development.

Early childhood education in China has made dramatic progress since the 1980s. In Tobin, et al. 2009, which studies across three cultures, the continuity and change across the systems of early childhood education are evident. The project report Zhongguo Xueqian Jiaoyu Fazhan Zhanlue Yanjiu Ketizu 2010 reflects upon the development of China's early childhood education and locates the current situation of the development of early childhood education. The historical development of Chinese early childhood education indicates three distinct cultural threads, including traditional culture, communist culture, and Western culture, that have shaped early childhood education in China, as demonstrated in Zhu and Zhang 2008 and Lau 2012. Furthermore, currently, administrative authorities intend to establish an independent budget for the ECE field in order to support early childhood education in rural areas (Zhao and Hu 2008). A higher quality of educational provisions for children living in rural areas will be another goal for the Chinese government. Many researchers have detailed the important issues of early childhood education, especially teacher education. The exploratory study in Hu and Szente 2010 (cited under Early Childhood Inclusive Education) has indicated that Chinese kindergarten teachers hold negative attitudes toward inclusion of children with disabilities, as they do not have enough knowledge and skills for working with this population. This indicates that kindergarten teachers need to improve their perceptions of children with disabilities. Furthermore, Gu 2007 has focused on the issues of new early childhood teachers' professional development and puts forward some feasible suggestions about how new teachers deal with key events in their everyday teaching practices. With regard to families' support of their children's early development at home, family education should be focused and the collaborative partnership between kindergarten and family needs to be enhanced. Teachers' attitudes toward family intervention are a vital aspect of teacher-family collaboration. Therefore, kindergarten teachers should support family members in their role as the child's first teacher and build collaborative partnerships with family, as presented in Ding 2007. Furthermore, kindergarten teachers should be considered as active researchers in children's role play. This supports the co-construction of their teaching knowledge in relation to children's initiation/subjectivity in role play (Liu, et al. 2003).

=== India ===
Preschool education in India is not yet officially recognized by the government and is largely run by privately held companies. The demand for play schools that cater to caring for very young children is high, with the rise in families in which both parents are working. However, a positive step forward in the direction of formalising preschool education has come forth through the NEP (National Education Policy) 2020. The NEP 2020 has placed a great deal of importance on early childhood care and education, advocating that the foundational stage (3 to 8 years) is critical and requires official/formal intervention. In fact, NEP 2020 has advocated replacing the traditional 10 + 2 schooling system with a 5+3+3+4 system.

=== Ireland ===
Starting in the year of 2010, Ireland passed a law stating that all children of the age 3 years and 2 months and less than 4 years and 7 months are qualified to attend a preschool free of charge. Before this law was passed there was a large number of children who did not attend an Early Childhood Education Program. The programs that were offered operated voluntary and required the parents to pay a steep fee per child. This left many families with no option but to keep the kids at home. The government soon realized that a large number of children were having trouble in their first years of primary school and parents were having to stay home becoming jobless. Once the government issued the free preschool scheme, Ireland's preschool enrollment rate increased to about 93%.

=== Japan ===
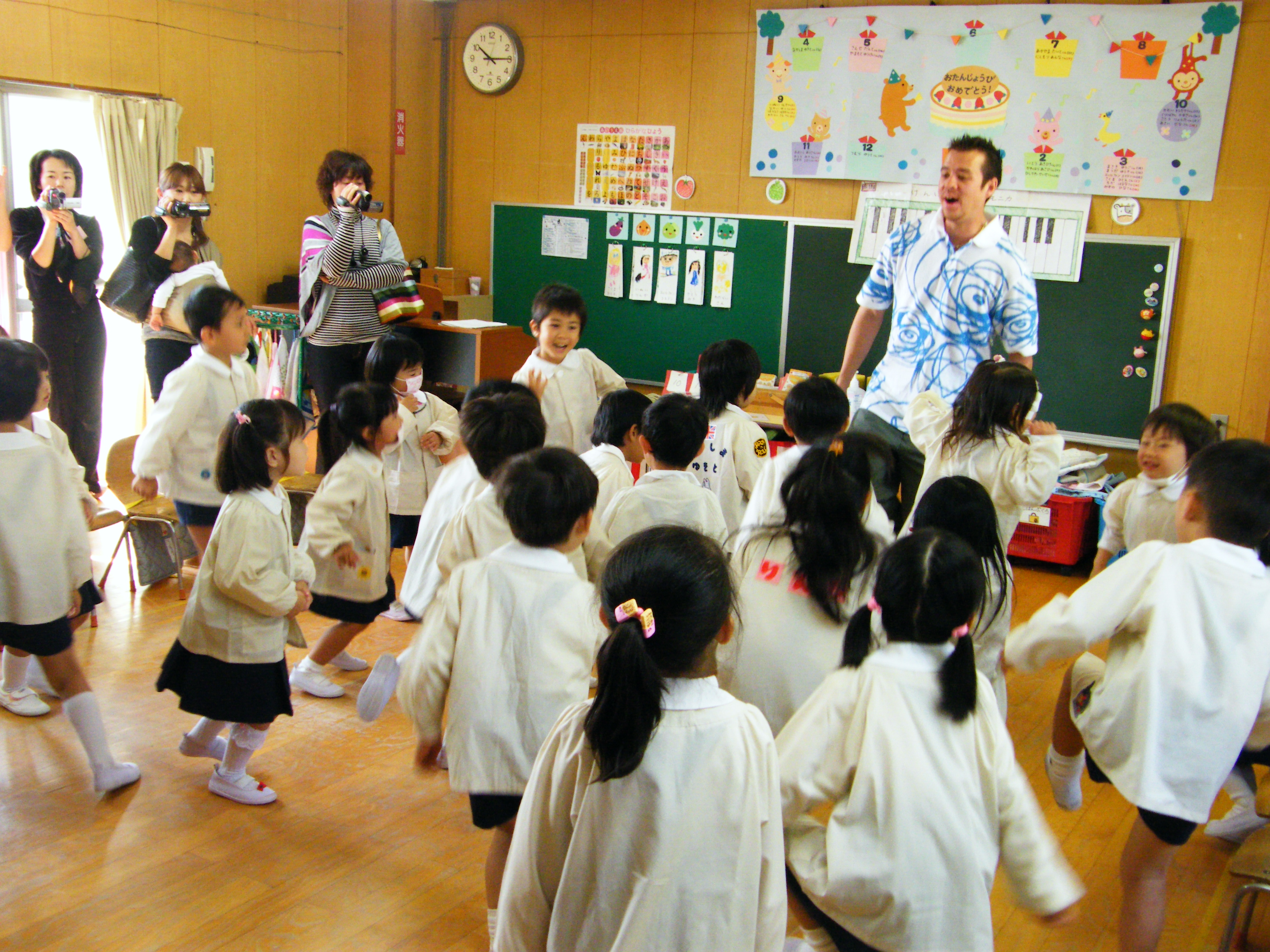
Young children in a kindergarten in Japan

In Japan, development of social skills and a sense of group belonging are major goals. Classes tend to have up to 40 students, to decrease the role of the teacher and increase peer interactions. Participation in group activities is highly valued, leading some schools to, for example, count a child who is standing still near a group exercise session as participating. Children are taught to work harmoniously in large and small groups, and to develop cooperativeness, kindness and social consciousness. The most important goal is to provide a rich social environment that increasingly isolated nuclear families do not provide; unstructured play time is valued.

Children are allowed to resolve disputes with each other, including physical fighting. Most behavioral problems are attributed to the child's inappropriately expressed emotional dependency. Remedies involve accepting the child, rather than treatment with drugs or punishment. Japanese culture attributes success to effort rather than inborn talent, leading teachers to ignore innate differences between children by encouraging and praising perseverance. They work to ensure that all students meet the standard rather that each reaches their own potential. Although preschools exhibit great variety, most target age-appropriate personal development, such as learning empathy, rather than academic programs. Academic programs tend to be more common among Westernized and Christian preschools.

Boisterous play is accepted. Kids are allowed to play with water guns or to make toy swords out of paper. Gun control is extensive, and real firearms are rarely seen in Japan, but playing with toy weapons is acceptable and encouraged.

=== Lithuania ===
According to the Law on Education (article 6, 1991, as last amended in April 2016), pre-school education is a part of non-formal education. According to the 7th article of the Law, "the purpose of pre-school education shall be to help a child satisfy inherent, cultural (including ethnic), social and cognitive needs." Despite the provision of pre-school education being an independent function of a municipality, the Law regulates the pre-school curriculum to be "prepared in compliance with the criteria of pre-school curricula approved by the Minister of Education, Science and Sport, [and] shall be implemented by pre-school education schools, general education schools, freelance teachers or other education providers" (article 7 part 4). The ownership of pre-school education facilities (namely, kindergartens) according to the Law could be public (state or municipality) as well as private.

=== North Korea ===
Preschool education in North Korea is public and provides a variety of activities, such as dance, math, drawing and Korean, as well as basic abilities such as using a spoon and respecting elders. North Korean kindergarten education includes themes common to North Korean propaganda. Subjects include the life of Kim Il Sung, the Japanese occupation of Korea, and the Korean War. Children are taught to enjoy military games and to hate the miguk nom, or "American bastards".

=== Philippines ===
Children usually enter kindergarten at age 5. Pupils are mandated to learn the alphabet, numbers, shapes and colors through games, songs, pictures, and dances in their native language; thus, after grade 1, every student can read in their native tongue. The 12 original mother tongue languages introduced for the curriculum's effectivity on 2012–2013 school year are:

- Bicolano
- Cebuano
- Chavacano
- Hiligaynon
- Ilocano
- Kapampangan
- Maguindanaoan
- Maranao
- Pangasinense
- Tagalog
- Tausug
- Waray-Waray

Seven more mother tongue languages were added during the 2013–2014 school year: Aklanon, Ibanag, Ivatan, Kinaray-a, Sambal, Surigaonon and Yakan.

=== Sweden ===
Preschool education in Sweden is offered from age 1 up to age 6. All preschools must follow the national curriculum set out by the Swedish National Agency for Education. Preschools are governed by the local municipalities.

=== Turkey ===
Preschool education in Turkey starts at the age of 5 while primary level education begins at the age of 6.

=== Armenia ===
Preschool education in Armenia starts at the age of 3 while primary level education begins at the age of 5.

=== United Kingdom ===
In the UK, pre-school education in nursery classes or schools has some local government funding for children aged between two and four. Pre-school education can be provided by childcare centres, playgroups, nursery schools and nursery classes within primary schools. Private voluntary or independent (PVI sector) nursery education is also available throughout the UK and varies between structured pre-school education and a service offering child-minding facilities.

Nursery in England is also called FS1 which is the first year of foundation before they go into primary or infants.

The curriculum goals of a nursery school are more specific than for childcare but less strenuous than for primary school. For example, the Scottish Early Years Framework and the Curriculum for Excellence define expected outcomes even at this age. In some areas, the provision of nursery school services is on a user pays or limited basis while other governments fund nursery school services.

==== England ====
A voucher system for nursery provision was introduced in England and Wales under the Major government, providing for 15 hours per week free childcare or education for three and four-year-olds, much of it provided through reception classes in primary schools. This was replaced by the Blair government with direct funding by local education authorities. Every child in England at the first school term after their third birthday is now entitled to 15 hours per week free childcare funding.

The Early Years Foundation Stage sets the standards that all early years providers must meet to ensure that children learn and develop well and are kept healthy and safe. It promotes teaching and learning to ensure children's 'school readiness' and gives children the broad range of knowledge and skills that provide the right foundation for good future progress through school and life.

Pre-schools in England follow the Early Years Foundation Stage statutory framework for education produced by the Department for Education, which carries on into their first year of school at the age of four. This year of school is usually called Reception. All pupils in the Early Years must follow a programme of education in seven areas, divided into 'prime areas' and 'specific areas'.

The three prime areas:

- communication and language
- physical development
- personal, social and emotional development

The four specific areas:

- literacy
- mathematics
- understanding the world
- expressive arts and design

Until the mid-1980s, nursery schools only admitted pupils in the final year (three terms) leading up to their admission to primary school, but pupils now attend nursery school for four or five terms. It is also common practice for many children to attend nursery much earlier than this. Many nurseries have the facilities to take on babies, using the 'Early Years Foundation Stage', framework as a guide to give each child the best possible start to becoming a competent learner and skilful communicator.

==== Wales ====
Provision in Wales followed England until devolution and subsequently diverged. Now early years education in Wales is provided half-time for children aged 3–4 (Nursery) and full-time for those between the ages of 4 and 5 (Reception). Since 2005 it has been a statutory duty for all Local Education Authorities to secure sufficient nursery education in their area for children from the term following their third birthday.

Currently, the Early Years curriculum in Wales, produced by the Welsh Assembly Government Department for Children, Education, Lifelong Learning and Skills, is set out in the booklet "Desirable Outcomes for Children's Learning Before Compulsory School Age". However, a new 'Foundation Phase' covering 3- to 7-year-olds is being rolled out across Wales from 2008, with a focus on 'learning through play', which covers seven areas of learning:

- Personal and Social Development and Well Being
- Language, Literacy and Communication Skills
- Mathematical Development
- Bilingualism and Multi-cultural Understanding
- Knowledge and Understanding of the World
- Physical Development
- Creative Development

==== Northern Ireland ====
In Northern Ireland funded Nursery School places can be applied for from ages 3 and up. Preschool education is delivered also by PreSchools, also referred to as Playschools or Playgroups. A Nursery School is allowed to enrol up to 26 children into a class, with the curriculum being delivered by a qualified teacher and a Nursery Assistant. A preschool, which delivers the same curriculum, is also permitted to admit a maximum of 26 children to any single session. However, the regulations for personnel differ. The Preschool must have a Supervisor with an NVQ 3 qualification in Child Care (or Equivalent). There must be one qualified and vetted adult for every 8 children. Funding is applied for through PEAGs (Preschool Education Advisory Group). Both nursery and preschool settings are inspected by the Education and Training Inspectorate. Preschools are also subject to inspection by local Social Services.

==== Scotland ====
In Scotland a voucher system for part-time pre-school provision was introduced in parallel with England and Wales under the Major government, but with a strong emphasis on age-appropriate education rather than simply childcare, and avoiding the use of reception classes in primary schools. Now children are entitled to a place in a nursery class when they reach their third birthday. This gives parents the option of two years of funded pre-school education before beginning primary one, the first year of compulsory education. Nursery children who are three years old are referred to as ante-pre-school whilst children who are four years old are termed pre-school. Pre-school education in Scotland is planned around the Early Level of the Curriculum for Excellence which identifies Outcomes & Experiences around the following eight curricular areas:

- Expressive Arts,
- Health & Wellbeing,
- Languages,
- Mathematics,
- Religious & Moral Education,
- Sciences
- Social Studies
- Technologies

Responsibility for the review of care standards in Scottish nurseries rests with the Care Commission.

=== United States ===
In the United States, nursery school is provided in a variety of settings. In general, preschool is meant to be voluntary and promote development in children through planned programs. Preschool is defined as a full year or longer of "center-based programs for four-year olds that are fully or partially funded by state education agencies and that are operated in schools or under the direction of state and local education agencies". Preschools, both private and school sponsored, are available for children from ages three to five. Many of these programs follow similar curriculum as pre-kindergarten.

In the United States, preschool education emphasizes individuality. Children are frequently permitted to choose from a variety of activities, using a learning center approach. During these times, some children draw or paint, some play house, some play with puzzles while some listen to the teacher read a story aloud. Activities vary in each session. Each child is assumed to have particular strengths and weaknesses to be encouraged or ameliorated by the teachers. A typical belief is that "children's play is their work" and that by allowing them to select the type of play, the child will meet their developmental needs. Preschools also adopt American ideas about justice, such as the rule of law and the idea that everyone is innocent until proven guilty. Teachers do not always actively intervene in disputes and encourage children to resolve disputes independently by using verbal strategies ("use your words"), stating objectively what the problem or issues are, and then discussing what steps can be taken to resolve it. Punishments that may or may not include time outs are rarely carried out by teachers. Children are encouraged to apologize after understanding what has happened rather than blindly apologize. Children are also encouraged to think through steps they can take to make up for their misbehavior. Teachers assist children by explaining what happened and what was wrong in their behavior, before any decision to punish is made. Self-expressive language skills are emphasized through informal interactions with teachers and through structured group activities such as show and tell exercises to enable the child to describe an experience to an adult. Resources vary depending on the wealth of the students, but generally are better equipped than other cultures. Most programs are not subsidized by government, making preschools relatively expensive even though the staff is typically poorly compensated. Student-teacher ratios are lower than in other cultures, ideally about 15 students per group. Parents and teachers see teachers as extensions of or partial substitutes for parents and consequently emphasize personal relationships and consistent expectations at home and at school.

In contrast to many other cultures, including Japan and the UK, American preschools frequently ban squirt guns and pretend play involving toy or imaginary weapons, and may have zero-tolerance policies that require punishing children who bring or make toy guns at school.

In the United States, students who may benefit from special education receive services in preschools. Since the enactment of the Individuals with Disabilities Education Act (IDEA) Public Law 101–476 in 1975 and its amendments, PL 102–119 and PL 105–17 in 1997, the educational system has moved away from self-contained special education classrooms to inclusion, leading special education teachers to practice in a wider variety of settings. As with other stages in the life of a child with special needs, the Individualized Education Plan (IEP) or an Individual Family Service Plan (IFSP) is an important way for teachers, administrators and parents to set guidelines for a partnership to help the child succeed in preschool.

==== Cooperative preschools ====
Cooperative preschools are common throughout much of America and focus on providing a preschool environment for children and parents which is in line with cooperative ideals:

- Parent involvement
- Parent participation
- Parent education in early childhood education programs

The University of Chicago playgroup, established in 1916, is often cited as the first cooperative preschool in the United States. However, some sources identify the Northside Cooperative Nursery School in Pasadena as an earlier example, though its exact founding date is unknown.

==== Head Start ====
The goal of Head Start and of Early Head Start is to increase the school preparedness of young children in low-income families. These programs serve children from birth to age five, pregnant women, and their families. Head Start was started by the Federal Government in 1964 to help meet the needs of under-privileged pre-school children.

The office of Economic Opportunity launched Project Head Start as an eight-week summer program in 1965. It was then transferred to the Office of Child Development in the US Department of Health, Education, and Welfare in 1969. Today it is a program within the Administration on Children, Youth and Families in the Department of Health and Human Services. Programs are administered locally by school systems and non-profit organizations.

- Services provided by Head Start
1. Disabilities – All programs fully include children with disabilities
2. Education – The goal of Head Start is to ensure that those children enrolled in the program are ready to begin school. Activities are geared towards skill and knowledge domains.
3. Family and Community Partnerships – both groups are involved in the operation, governance, and evaluation of the program.
4. Health – Health is seen as an important factor in a child's ability to thrive and develop. The program provides screenings to evaluate a child's overall health, regular health check-ups, and good practices in oral health, hygiene, nutrition, personal care, and safety.
5. Program Management and Operations – "focus on delivering high-quality child development services to children from low-income families."

== See also ==
- Children's television series
- Daycare
- Education theory
- Heutagogy
- Pedagogy
- Poisonous pedagogy
- Pre-kindergarten
- Reggio Emilia approach
- Waldorf education
- Miriam Roth (1910–2005) – Israeli writer and scholar of children's books, kindergarten teacher, and educator

== Sources ==
- Davidson, Dana H.; Tobin, Joseph Jay; Wu, David Y. H. (1989). Preschool in three cultures: Japan, China, and the United States. New Haven, Conn: Yale University Press. pp. 188–221. ISBN 978-0-300-04235-1.
