= Classroom pet =

Animal kept in a school classroom

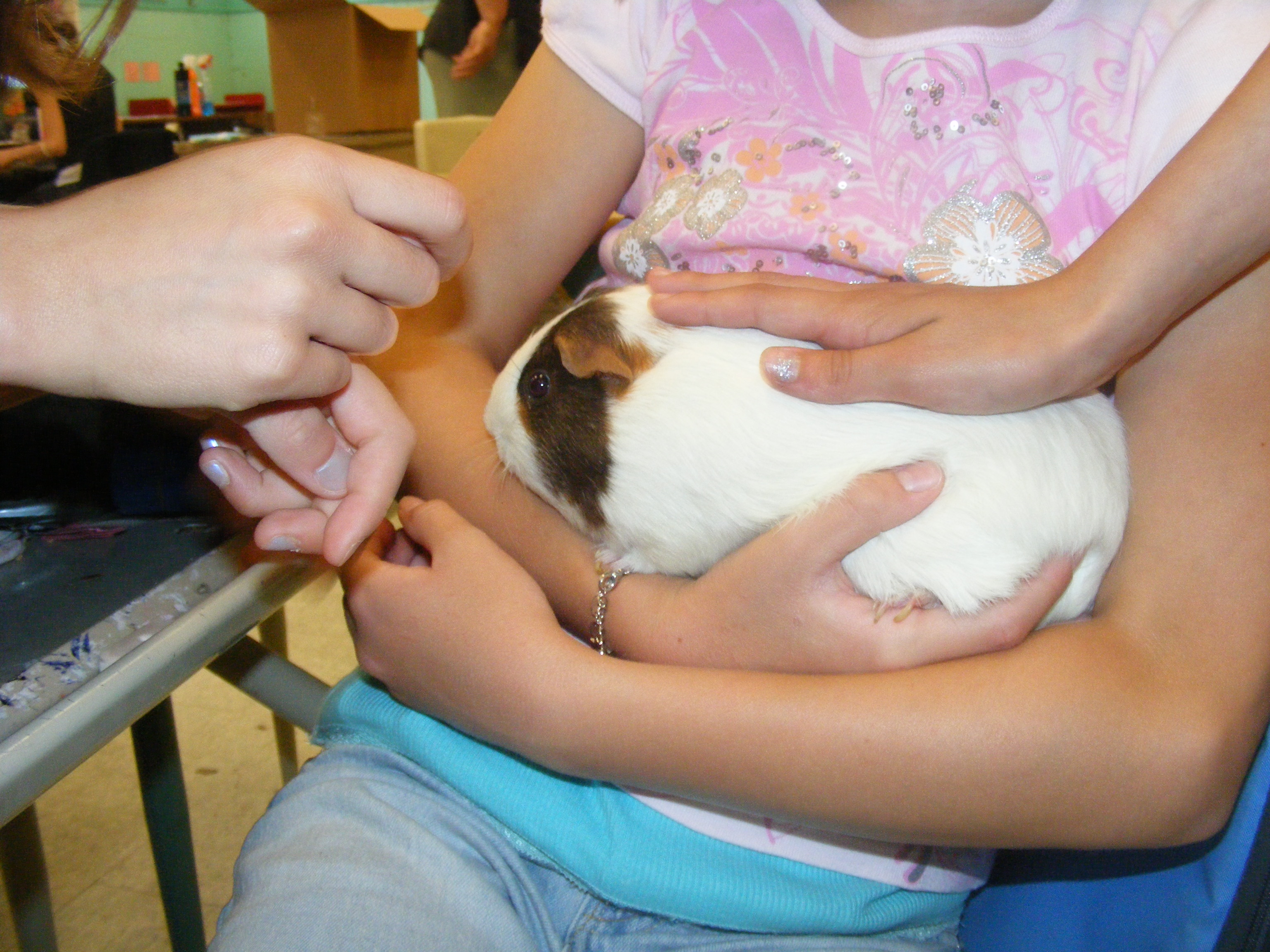
A guinea pig as a classroom pet.

Classroom pets are animals that are present in an educational classroom as a pet. Research and literature in the 21st century has shown the main reasons for having classroom pets is to capture the attention of students, improve relationships, provide the opportunity for creative activities, be a resource for humane education, and act as a motivator for students. Animal species most commonly used and kept as classroom pets include: guinea pigs, hamsters, gerbils, fancy rats, fancy mice, hedgehogs, certain reptiles like lizards, bearded dragons, turtles, snakes, and geckos, birds, amphibians, arthropods, that include butterflies, stick insects, and other insects, arachnids, such as spiders and scorpions, snails and hermit crabs, as well as goldfish, guppies, Siamese fighting fish and other aquarium fish. Species that are not recommended for classrooms include iguanas, domestic rabbits, ferrets, and some others like chinchillas.

== Educational impact ==
In 1987, The National Institute of Health reported evidence on the health benefits of pets and further studies have shown positive effects from children's relationships with pets. It has thus been assumed that similar benefits would present themselves in classroom pets for students.

In some countries school dogs are trained and assessed to achieve educational outcomes.

=== Social-emotional development ===
Classroom pets can support young children's social-emotional development. Classroom pets help build positive relationships through discussions about classroom pets, such as what to name it, and how to care for it, and then working together to do so. This also aids in the development of friendships within the classroom. It has been found that students develop a sense of caring about others other than themselves through tending to the needs of the animals in the classroom. It has also been seen that discussions about the behaviors of the animals in the classroom, what they mean, and what the students can do about it can help students become empathetic towards others. Teachers have claimed that classroom pets also teach children the value of routines and rules. One study compared students in a classroom with class pets to one without for 8 weeks. The study found that both parents and teachers reported that the students in the class with the guinea pigs had greater increases in social skills and decreases in behavior problems at the end of the 8 weeks. These results support similar previous study results.

Young children's interaction with classroom pets can also help them manage feelings and emotions. Research has shown that children need an empathetic listener whenever they feel troubled. Children can be encouraged to share their feelings with their animals if they do not want to express them with an adult. A study surveying 75 elementary teachers, revealed that most teachers believed students displayed an increase in compassion and empathy when pets were used in the classroom. Additional findings have shown that classroom pets, not only improve compassion and empathy but also teach children to have respect for the living things in the world around them.

Classroom pets can also have a positive effect on the social-emotional development of students with autism spectrum disorder. After engaging in animal-assisted activities for 8-weeks, children with autism spectrum disorder displayed an increase in social skills and a decrease in social withdrawal.

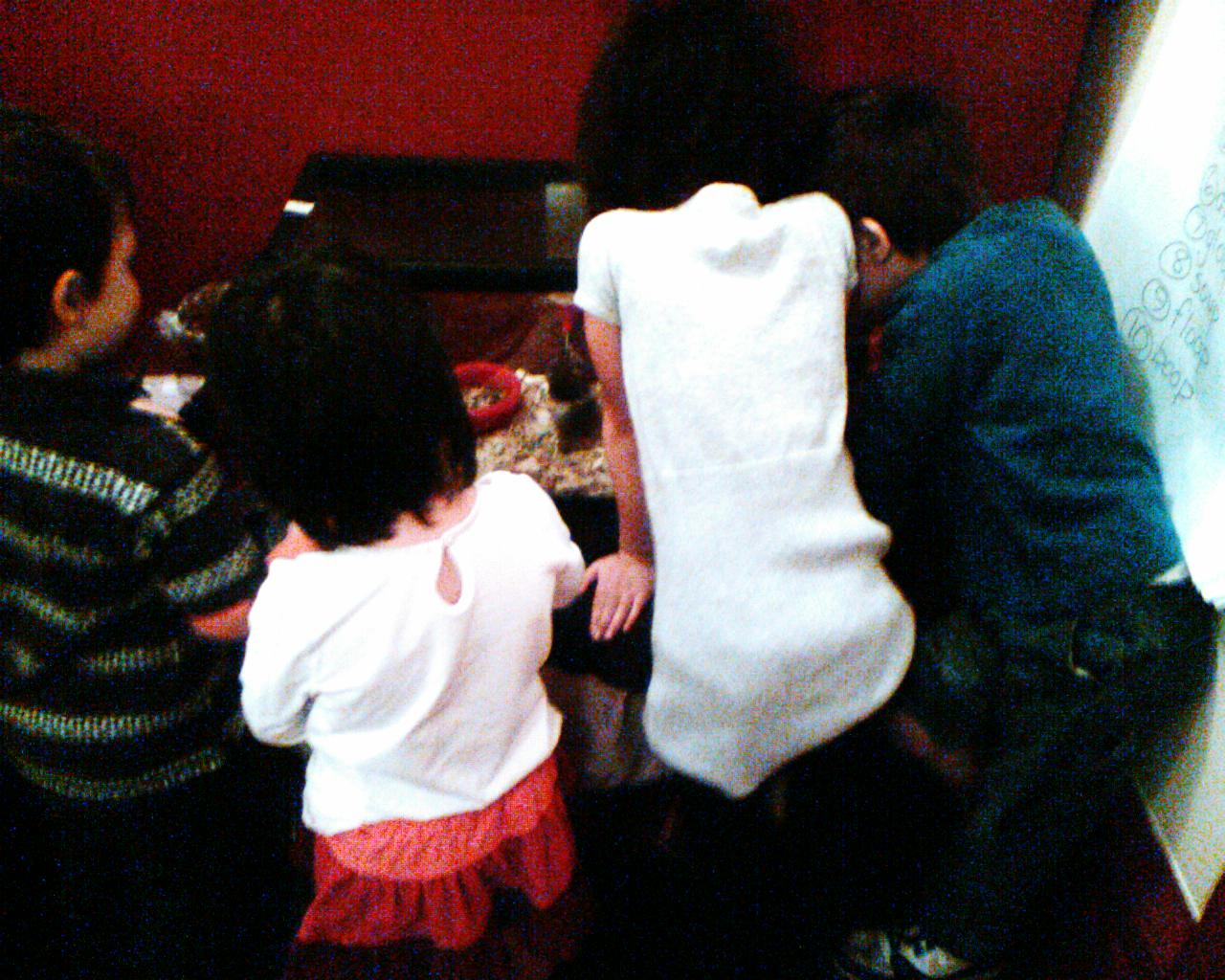
A group of Pre-K children huddle around a cage of the classroom pet.

=== Academic development ===
Teachers conveyed that classroom pets contribute to the academic development of students and have identified pets as important sources for students. They have found them to expand learning and increase development. Academic lessons, ranging from science to language arts, have been enriched by this valuable source and have improved academic competence among students. Classroom pets create an object of observation and research for children during science class. Children will learn how to care for the animal, what it eats, and what type of surroundings it needs to live. Science can also be linked with language arts using classroom pets. Students can write books and create presentations from their research. Students academic skills in math also increase by having a classroom pet. Students can measure its physical attributes and how quickly or how far it moves using graphs or charts (Benham, 1991, p. 21).

=== Increased teacher awareness ===
Through the use of a dog-assisted activity program in a multi-cultural elementary classroom, researchers found that teachers are more aware of student difficulties and strengths after interacting with dogs. After engaging with dogs, it was found that students expressed emotions and displayed behaviors more clearly, helping teachers recognize student qualities that were hidden prior to the dog-assisted activity. This suggests that the presence of classroom pets does not only benefit students but also results in increased teacher awareness. Despite these results, survey research shows that only about 17% of elementary teachers have classroom pets.
