= International Public Management Association for Human Resources =

- Formation: 1906
- Type: Professional association
- Headquarters: Alexandria, VA
- Website: https://www.ipma-hr.org

The International Public Management Association for Human Resources (IPMA-HR) is an organization that represents the interests of human resource professionals at the federal, state and local levels of government. IPMA-HR members include all levels of public sector HR professionals. The association's goal is to provide information and assistance to help HR professionals increase their job performance and overall agency function by providing cost effective products, services and educational opportunities.

The mission of IPMA-HR is to provide human resource leadership and advocacy, professional development, information and services to enhance organizational and individual performance in the public sector.

== See also ==
- List of human resource management associations
