= Class arrangement =

Layout of furniture in a school classroom

Class arrangement refers to a layout of the physical setup of chairs, tables, materials in a school classroom. In most countries, this arrangement is often chosen by a paid, professional teacher with the assistance of a seating chart. Deciding upon a classroom arrangement is typically done at the beginning of a school year as a part of classroom management.

== Arrangement patterns ==
Classroom arrangements can follow different patterns such as:

- Rows or Traditional (students facing the instructor)
- Stadium Seating (or Angled Rows with Desks Touching)
- Modified U (or Horseshoe)
- Groups (or Pods, Teams)
- Combination (desks in various positions)
- Roundtable (students and instructors facing the center)

== Effects ==
Class arrangement is thought to affect the student engagement, focus and participation. Some research suggests that seating location is related to academic achievement and classroom participation, and class arrangement has the ability to affect the communal environment within the room. For individual tasks class arrangement in rows can increase on task focus, especially for disruptive students.

== History ==
Around the turn of the 20th century, new education mandates and laws banning child labor rapidly increase school enrollments, standardizing facility design. Traditional classroom layouts had students facing the instructor with their backs toward each other. The modern and flexible open space classroom represents a change from traditional chair desk combos.
