= Human Resources Management Association of Chicago =

Professional association in Illinois, US

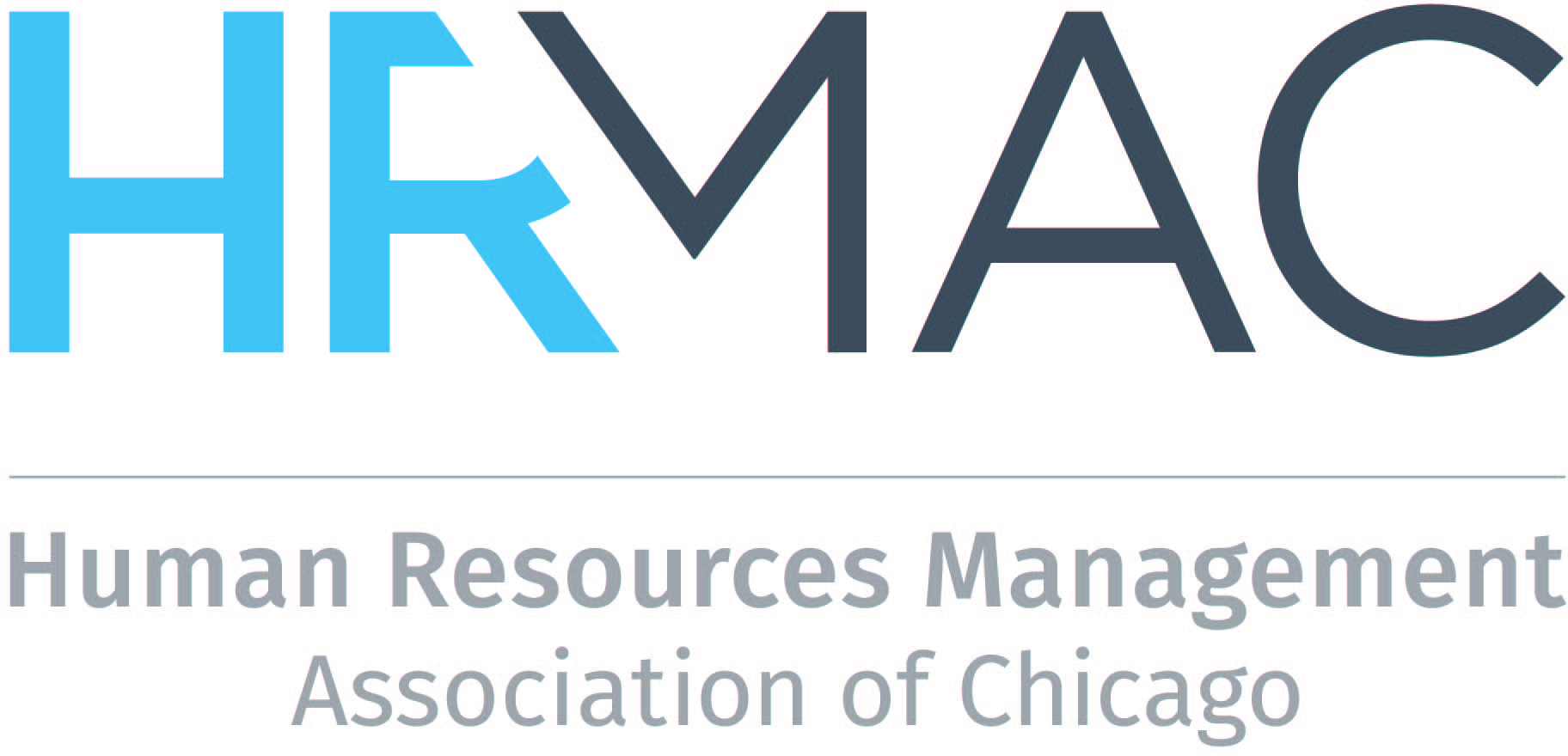
- Formation: 1915
- Type: Professional association
- Headquarters: Chicago, Illinois
- Website: www.executivesclub.org/hrmac-institute/

The Human Resources Management Association of Chicago (HRMAC) is a corporate membership organization focused on delivering services to primarily Chicago area employers. As the oldest traditional such organization in the U.S., it is a stand-alone group unaffiliated with any other state or national organizations. It serves as a forum for human resources leaders, practitioners, service providers and business executives responsible for designing and implementing workforce strategies to drive business performance in their organizations. In October of 2021, HRMAC merged with the Executives' Club of Chicago and formed The HRMAC Institute within the Exec Club.

== Organization Time Line ==
1915: Fred V. Cann, of the training staff of Lakeside Press, invited several men from Chicago institutions to meet with him for the following purposes: acquaintance; mutual benefits; to assist in the proper placement and adjustment of those entering industries from the schools; exchange of young employees, rather than discharge of those not properly placed; study of employment records, test and job analysis; and close cooperation of the schools and the industries."

This meeting led to the formation of the Employment Advisors Club of Chicago. Though there appeared to have been one other such group in the country in Boston, it was affiliated with the local Chamber of Commerce and had individual memberships, rather than corporate. Thus, the Chicago group could have a claim to being the first human resources organization for corporate members in the United States.

The Employment Advisors Club of Chicago held its first formal meeting on November 1, 1915, at the City Club. The speaker was Dr. H. D. Kitson of the University of Chicago, on the subject of "Psychological Tests in Employment."

The meeting was covered in the next morning’s Chicago Tribune in the article, "Bump Your Head If You Want Job; Feeling ‘Em Now." The title is cryptic and today, but the writer’s opinion couldn’t be clearer on the "psychologists and character experts who say they are able to tell whether a man is fitted to become a cook or a carpenter by a look at his nose or a measurement of his head."

Mr. E.E. Sheldon, one of the Club’s founders, later related, "My telephone began ringing and continued to ring….I had to take myself down to the Tribune and find the reporter who had inserted that article…. Although no great harm came, we did get a good deal of advertising from that half-page in the Tribune."

1916: the Employment Advisor’s Club Ways and Means Committee set dues at $25.00 for company membership and $10.00 for placement agencies and civic memberships.

1919: In March a letter from the U. S. Department of Labor to Mr. Samuel T. Loftus officially chartered the "Employment Managers Association of Chicago." The word of the charter was excitedly communicated to the members back in Chicago, and the organization became "The Chicago Council of the National Association of Employment Managers (NAEM)."

The NAEM, founded in 1918, was one of the first organizations in the country to focus on corporate training and personnel issues, and Chicago was one of the first cities in the country to join in the formation of the national association. The first national conference was held in Cleveland in 1919.

1920: The National Association of Employment Managers became the Industrial Relations Association of America, and Chicago NAEM becomes the Industrial Relations Association of Chicago (IRAC.)

In May, IRAC hosted the second annual national convention of the Industrial Relations Association. The three-day event drew more than 2,000 people from the United States and Canada. Cyrus McCormick, Jr., President of International Harvester, gave the opening address. Topics included "Radicalism," "Americanization," "How Many Hours per Day," "Shortage of Labor," and "Financial and Non-Financial Incentives."

1921: Chicago becomes the largest of the 36 affiliated chapters of the Industrial Relations Association of America.

1930s: In 1934 IRAC holds the 1st annual Midwest Conference on Industrial Relations. Throughout the thirties, IRAC continues to present information sessions for members and convene special committees on topics of interest. One topic of discussion was vacation pay. "Constant pressure from the employee representatives for the further extension of vacations with pay is in evidence in the records of these joint bodies. The former limitations to certain groups have been largely removed. The trend is in the direction of vacations with pay for all groups of employees." By 1938, the group’s membership stands at 83.

1940: IRAC celebrates its 25th anniversary with a gala dinner and meeting at the Palmer House. The celebration opened with the entire group singing ‘Happy Birthday, dear Association’ as an enormous birthday cake with lighted candles was wheeled into the room and up to the speakers table….

1943: IRAC and the University of Chicago School of Business hosted the 10th Annual Midwest Conference on Industrial Relations.) The theme was "Labor for the Duration: A Duration that will be Longer than the War." The afternoon was devoted to roundtables on subjects including: "Recent War Labor Board Directives," "Pension and Profit Sharing Plans Under Recent Governmental Regulations," "Wage Incentives," "Effective Utilization of Essential Manpower," and "Employee Morale."

1945: IRAC pitched in to do its part for veterans of World War II. The President of IRAC documents this in a letter to Mr. G.L. Bergen, Personnel Manager at Marshall Field and Company: You are aware of the commitment we have with the Air Services Placement Center. In a recent conference with Commander Lyon of that group he advised me that they are now ready to start operating at capacity. Member companies provided personnel to give a day a month at the office of the Air Services Placement Center, working with separating fliers from the Navy, Army, Marine Corps, and Coast Guard. IRAC members gave counseling and career guidance to the servicemen, and linked them with job openings.

1950s: In 1950 IRAC membership was over 200. The Personnel Journal," September 1950, featured an article about IRAC by Theron Wright, President, Chicago Industrial Relations Association and Personnel Officer, Chicago Title and Trust Co. In referring to IRAC, the article states that "Chicago is the home of one of the oldest and most active of the many local personnel association in the country and Canada." Throughout the 1950s, IRAC continued to expand its membership and present speakers of national prominence, including Robert F. Kennedy (Dec. ’58), then chief counsel for the Senate labor rackets committee. In November, 1959, and Secretary of Labor James P. Mitchell drew 430 to a meeting in Chicago's Prudential Building.

1965: IRAC celebrates its 50th anniversary. As noted in the Annual Report of 1965, The final meeting, our Annual Meeting, being the Golden Anniversary of the Industrial Relations Association of Chicago, was held on May 19, 1965 in the Grand Ballroom of the Conrad Hilton Hotel. Also in 1965, Dr. Robert R. Blake presented to IRAC on his new management model, "The Managerial Grid" which became one of the most famous models of management style and a cornerstone of organizational psychology for years to come.

1970s: IRAC continues to grow and hold educational meetings for its members. In the Fall Conference, themed "The Strategic New Role of Human Resource Management," drew an attendance of 350 members. Jane Byrne, Mayor of Chicago at the time, gave the keynote speech, "Building a Better Business Climate".

1982: IRAC adopts its current name, "Human Resources Management Association of Chicago" (HRMAC).

2021: HRMAC merges with the Executives' Club of Chicago and forms The HRMAC Institute within the Exec Club.

== Interest Groups ==
HRMAC Interest Groups provide a forum for HR professionals to connect with like-minded peers through the over 50 educational/networking events each year.

== Professional Development ==
HRMAC offers over 65 professional development and networking events annually. Programming is designed to address cutting edge issues facing businesses and provide strategies to create human capital practices that support organization objectives. HRMAC's capstone annual event is Summit held each fall.
