= Recognition Professionals International =

- Formation: 1998
- Type: Professional body
- Headquarters: Naperville, Illinois, United States
- President: Brian Dodds
- Website: www.recognition.org

Recognition Professionals International (or RPI) is a professional association which represents workers in the field of human resources. RPI aims to promote the role of human resources as a profession, and provides networking, education, certification in workplace recognition. RPI was better known as the National Association of Employee Recognition (NAER)—a name the association bore from its inception in 1998 until the change in 2007.

A non-profit organization, RPI is currently sponsored by companies including Discover Financial Services, BMW Manufacturing, Vanderbilt University Medical Center, Wells Fargo, and Sears.

== History ==
A grassroots effort of professionals at AT&T, Walt Disney World, and Chevron, a small group of consistent management conference goers were impressed to form RPI (at that time known as the NAER) in order to share recognition best practices. Three companies (Sears, BI, and the O.C. Tanner Company) made significant financial contributions and became the original founding sponsors, and the NAER was officially formed in 1998. The first conference as an association was held in Atlanta, GA with only 90+ attendees.

In just a few years, the NAER grew from about 50 members to over 500. The association saw a 35% increase in membership from 2001 to 2002. In 2007, the NAER changed its name to Recognition Professionals International to reflect a more world-view of its goals.

== Membership ==
There are no prerequisites to membership in RPI. The standard annual membership fee is $250, but RPI offers discounts for corporate groups.

== Certifications ==
The designation of Certified Recognition Professional (CRP) is granted upon completion of four courses covering how to structure recognition programs for success, strategic planning and measurement, recognition management and maintenance, and how to apply recognition systems.

== Recognition and research ==
Every year RPI sponsors an annual review of nominees for the RPI Best Practices Awards, which identify the best overall recognition practice, best recognition strategy, best communication plan, and best recognition program measurement. Award criteria include the following: recognition strategy, management responsibility, recognition program measurement, communication plan, recognition training, recognition events and celebrations, and program change and flexibility. Recent Best Overall Recognition Program awardees include MGM Grand (2007), Westfield Group (2006), and Conemaugh Memorial Medical Center (2005). In addition to its award program, RPI further encourages grass roots employee recognition as a strong proponent of National Employee Recognition Day (March 3).

== See also ==
- List of human resource management associations
