= Association for Talent Development =

Non-profitable association

Association for Talent Development (formerly American Society for Training & Development)
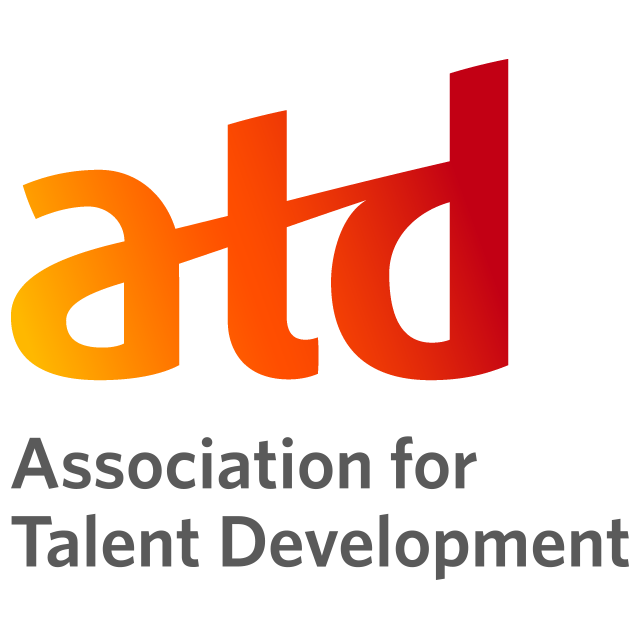
- Formation: 1943
- Type: Professional association
- Headquarters: Alexandria, Virginia
- President & CEO: Tony Bingham
- Website: https://www.td.org/

The Association for Talent Development (ATD), formerly American Society for Training & Development (ASTD), is a non-profit association serving those who develop talent in the workplace.

== Membership ==
ATD has an international as well as US membership base (more than 120 countries; 100 U.S. chapters; 18 international strategic partners and global networks). The association's members work in every industry and sector.

== Capability model ==
ATD has a capability model as a guide for its professional constituency. The original model was published in 2004 and has been updated several times. The latest model published in 2020, includes three key domains of practice: personal capability, professional capability, and organizational capability that consist of 23 embedded capabilities, and is a framework to guide the TD profession in what practitioners need to know and do to develop themselves, others, and their organizations. This model is a basis for ATD's Certified Professional in Talent Development (CPTD) and Associate Professional in Talent Development (APTD) credentials offered by the ATD Certification Institute.

== About ATD ==
ATD was founded as the American Society for Training Directors in 1943. The organization began in New Orleans during a training committee meeting of the American Petroleum Institute in 1942. The following year, a group of 15 professionals met for the first board meeting of the American Society for Training Directors in Baton Rouge, Louisiana.

They became the governing body of the association, which convened its membership in Chicago in 1945. Other local, regional, and industry-specific training groups gradually aligned with ASTD. At the 1946 convention, ASTD adopted a constitution with the goals of: raising awareness on the standards and prestige of the industrial training profession and furthering the professional's education and development.

ASTD retained these points as their official mission, even as the profession evolved and the business world changed. In 1964, the association changed its name to the American Society for Training & Development. ASTD eventually widened its focus to connect learning and performance with business results. In 2000, the organization chose to refer to itself just by the letters ASTD, to underscore that it wanted to broaden its scope as a professional organization. Its mission statement is “Create a world that works better.”

On May 6, 2014, in order "to better meet the needs and represent the work of this dynamic profession," the American Society for Training and Development (ASTD) was rebranded to the Association for Talent Development (ATD).

== Media, programs, conferences, and awards ==
ATD publishes books and periodicals, and produces webcasts, podcasts, and videos. It also conducts several research projects each year on the workplace and investment in learning. All of this is designed to offer members and others in the global talent development community resources for their professional development. Information is also used by organizations that are seeking best practices and trusted research in talent development.

ATD's also offers education programming in all modalities, face-to-face classroom instruction, virtual offerings, synchronous, asynchronous, and adaptive programs. Attendees can enroll in certificate programs or workshops. Programs are offered in many locations and can also be brought onsite to organizations.

ATD hosts many conferences in the U.S. and internationally. These include: International Conference & Exposition, ATD TechKnowledge Conference and EXPO, Core 4, TalentNext, SELL, Learn from the BEST, ATD-Yale Foundations of Management Excellence, LearnNow workshops, and summits in China, Japan, Korea, and Mexico. Additionally, each fall ATD hosts the ATD Chapter Leaders Conference (ALC) in the Washington, D.C., area. This conference is held to bring leaders of local ATD chapters together in one place and discuss how to better lead the organization on a local level. The full conference features numerous breakout sessions from individuals in the learning and development field from around the country and a keynote speech from the president of ATD, Tony Bingham.

ATD also has awards programs that recognize organizations and individuals for their excellence in talent development.

=== Award recipients ===
- PIXELearning Ltd (Excellence in Practice Award, 2007): Audit training simulation for big 4 accountancy firm ASTD

== See also ==
- List of human resource management associations
