= Learning centers in American elementary schools =

The learning center strategy uses eight basic learning centers to address the countless objectives of American early childhood classrooms, attempting to develop the student's social, emotional, physical, cognitive, and aesthetic abilities.

There are eight basic learning centers in an early childhood/elementary classroom, according to the Stephen F. Austin State University Charter School program, each structured to expand the students’ experiences in a variety of meaningful and effective ways. Each center is constructed to encompass numerous objectives, including state and federal standards, school standards, and community standards. The learning centers approach focuses on student autonomy and learning style by giving each student an opportunity to explore his learning environment hands-on in a developmentally appropriate classroom (see Constructivism). Teachers act as facilitators, providing materials and guidance, as well as planning discussions, activities, demonstrations, and reviews.

== Importance of learning centers ==
Learning centers are typically set up in a classroom to encourage children to make choices. As they work in the centers they learn to work independently as well as cooperatively. This gives the child more control over what they do. Learning centers offer one easy route to addressing children's individual learning styles.

== Basic learning centers ==
One important learning center that is invaluable to an independent learning environment that fosters creativity and expression is the "art center". According to Dodge, Colker, and Heroman, the art center allows children to visually express themselves. Children also learn how to critically evaluate their artwork, as well as the artwork as others, helping them to practice and develop their cognitive skills, language skills, and aesthetics. Art also offers many opportunities for core subject integration, especially in regard to science, social studies, or language arts. For instance, when studying the anatomy of a flower, the teacher could ask students to draw and color their own flowers based on an accurate representation of a flower or diagram.

Next, the "blocks center" is essential in a pre-kindergarten classroom, and greatly valued in older grades. The blocks center gives children an opportunity to recreate experiences, and explore the elements and complexities of structures. Children learn about their community and its functions while building representations of common buildings like fire stations, houses, libraries, and zoos. A plethora of other subjects can be integrated in the blocks center, including literacy, mathematics, science, social studies, art, and technology. The blocks center is an especially good place for children to explore the rules of society, relationships, and teamwork.

Another center is "Discovery", a place where children can explore the answers to questions driven by their natural curiosity Science is a special subject in discovery, as gives children the chance to explore life, earth, and the laws of nature. The discovery center sets the stage for students to use the scientific method to predict and find solutions starting during the second half of first grade. Tyler, Texas' Discovery Science Place features numerous types of discovery centers.

"Dramatic play" centers promote social interaction, role exploration, and abstract thinking. Children are given the opportunity to deeply explore roles of people in their family and community. Pretending is an important part developing abstract thought, such as connecting symbols with real objects and events. Dramatic play greatly enhances a child's social and emotional development when children cooperate, feel empathy, and control their emotions.

In the United States, literacy is a number one priority for both public and private education. In fact, the United States’ literacy rate is one of the highest in the world, reaching 99% of the population. For this reason, "library centers" are a major contribution to not only learning center curriculum, but all other classroom strategies. In the library center, children learn the importance of reading and writing by engaging in motivational literacy activities through meaningful contexts. The library center also gives the child opportunities to practice reading, have immediate access to print materials for independent reading, participate in read-alouds and retellings (Dodge, Colker, and Heroman, p. 371-373), and share experiences they have had with books. The library center can enhance the theme of any classroom curriculum. For instance, when doing a science unit on mammals, studying human impact on animal life in social studies, and creating pictures of animals in art, the teacher could also facilitate books and activities in the library center about animals, creating connections between subjects. Furthermore, many children are not exposed to literature in their homes, severely limiting their print knowledge. The library center provides these children with regular and active interactions with print.

A pertinent center to the American health and obesity epidemic is the "muscle center". In the muscle center, students engage in activities that exercise their bodies, and subsequently “wake up” their minds. Movement also allows children to outlet their high energy and creativity. During muscle activities, students learn to control their bodies and apply gross motor skills to new types of movement.

Next, the "music center" creates opportunities for children to cooperate in activities that stimulate creativity, listening, and language. By engaging in songs, children learn the natural intonations and rhythms of language. When singing together, children feel harmony with their classmates. Music instruction has also been proven to increase intelligence quotient. Music also offers an easy way for those children on a lower developmental level to participate successfully in a fun group activity.

Lastly, the "table games center" offers a unique way for children to explore established rules, create their own rules, and enforce those rules. Table games also promote healthy competition, giving students a chance to cope with negative feelings in a safe and supportive environment. Children explore mathematical concepts while playing games like cards, dice, and Connect Four. Children must plan strategies in order to problem solve and win the game.

Another important center that should be included in this list is a writing center. Set up an environment that supports and motivates writing. Provide writing materials in all of your learning centers. Once writing becomes established in the classroom, you'll find that it carries over into a variety of activities. Memo pads, notepads, and stationery placed in manipulative, library, or art areas can transform the activities children typically engage in there. These writing materials allow children to create their own activities and play scenarios, reinforcing the important message that there are many uses for writing </ref Neuman ref>.

Encourage independent use of learning centers with these quick and easy tips

1. Define the space. Use throw rugs, bookcases, and curtains to help children contain their play within the center.
2. Take a room tour. Start the year by taking a few children at a time on a quick tour of the centers. Show them where materials are and how to put them away.
3. Keep materials accessible. Put current materials for each center in well-defined containers and marked shelves at children's eye level.
4. Store a few teacher materials in each center. It takes too much time to have to search for your own materials. Place your materials on a high shelf in each area.
5. Stock centers sparingly. It is easier for children to manage materials if there are just a few items there. As children learn how to easily use and put materials away, ask them to suggest what new items they would like to add to the centers.
6. Set up portable centers. Use plastic tubs or bins to create portable centers children can take to a private area to work and play.
7. Make a cooperative center rules chart. At a group time, encourage children to suggest rules for working/playing in learning centers. If children are having difficulty, suggest issues such as sharing materials, respecting each other's work, and putting materials away.
8. Display children's work. Use bulletin boards, shelf backs, cardboard boxes or room dividers as a place to show children what others have done in the center.
9. Set up a works-in-progress shelf. Sometimes children don't have enough time to complete a project in a center. Create a "safe place" where children can store ongoing projects.
10. Create a take-home box. Set out a box near the door for children to place their finished projects for take-home at the end of the day </ref Church, E.<ref>.

== Bibliography ==
- 10 Signs of a Great Preschool. The National Association for the Education of Young Children. Retrieved May 1, 2007, from
- Bickart, T., Jablon, J., Dodge, D. (1999). Building the Primary Classroom: A Complete Guide to Teaching and Learning. Teaching Strategies, Inc.
- Bower, Bruce. (June 19, 2004) Tuning Up Young Minds: Music lessons give kids a small IQ advantage. Science News, Vol. 165, No. 25, p. 389. Retrieved May 1, 2007, from
- Church, E. (2005, September). Involving Children in Learning Centers. Early Childhood Today, 20(1), 4-4. Retrieved July 10, 2009, from Academic Search Complete database.
- Dodge, D., Colker, L., and Heroman, C. (2002). The Creative Curriculum for Preschool (4th Ed.). Teaching Strategies, Inc.
- ECH 331 Curriculum Author. Science Powerpoint. Powerpoint presentation presented in online unit in ECH 331 Online at Stephen F. Austin State University, Nacogdoches, TX.
- Hayes, K., & Creange, R. (2001). Classroom Routines That Really Work for PreK and Kindergarten. New York, NY: Scholastic Professional Books.
- Learning All Around the Room. (2002, January). Early Childhood Today, Retrieved July 10, 2009, from Academic Search Complete database.
- Learning to Read and Write: Developmentally Appropriate Practices for Young Children (May 1998). A joint position statement of the International Reading Association and the National Association for the Education of Young Children. Retrieved May 1, 2007, from
- Neuman, S. (2004, January). Supporting Beginning Writing. Early Childhood Today, 18(4), 39-39. Retrieved July 10, 2009, from Academic Search Complete database.
