= Experiential knowledge =

Knowledge gained through experience

Experiential knowledge is knowledge gained through experience, as opposed to a priori (before experience) knowledge: it can also be contrasted both with propositional (textbook) knowledge, and with practical knowledge.

Experiential knowledge is cognate to Michael Polanyi's personal knowledge, as well as to Bertrand Russell's contrast of Knowledge by Acquaintance and by Description.

== A posteriori ==
In the philosophy of mind, the phrase often refers to knowledge that can only be acquired through experience, such as, for example, the knowledge of what it is like to see colours, which could not be explained to someone born blind: the necessity of experiential knowledge becomes clear if one was asked to explain to a blind person a colour like blue.

The question of a posteriori knowledge might be formulated as: can Adam or Eve know what water feels like on their skin prior to touching it for the first time?

== Religion ==
Zen emphasises the importance of the experiential element in religious experience, as opposed to what it sees as the trap of conceptualization: as D. T. Suzuki put it, "fire. Mere talking of it will not make the mouth burn".

Experiential knowledge has also been used in the philosophy of religion as an argument against God's omniscience, questioning whether God could genuinely know everything, since he (supposedly) cannot know what it is like to sin. Commenting on the distinction between experiential knowledge and propositional knowledge, analytic philosopher and theologian William Lane Craig has stated in an interview with Robert Lawrence Kuhn for the PBS series Closer to Truth that because experiential knowledge is appropriate to the mind which does the knowing, in order for omniscience to be a cognitive perfection God's omniscience must entail God know only and all propositional truths and have only appropriate experiential knowledge.

== Ecology ==
Writer Barry Lopez writes about experiential knowledge and how it relates back to the environment, arguing that without experiencing nature, one cannot fully "know" and understand the relationships within ecosystems.

== Therapy ==
Carl Rogers stressed the importance of experiential knowledge both for the therapist formulating his or her theories, and for the client in therapy – both things with which most counsellors would agree.

As defined by Thomasina Borkman (Emeritus Professor of Sociology, George Mason University) experiential knowledge is the cornerstone of therapy in self-help groups, as opposed to both lay (general) and professional knowledge. Sharing in such groups is the narration of significant life experiences in a process through which the knowledge derived thereof is validated by the group and transformed into a corpus that becomes their fundamental resource and product.

Neville Symington has argued that one of the central features of the narcissist is a shying away from experiential knowledge, in favour of adopting wholesale a ready-made way of living drawn from other people's experience.

== Culture ==
Helen Vendler has characterised Seamus Heaney's art as, in one respect, recording an experiential learning curve: "we are earthworms of the earth, and all that / has gone through us is what will be our trace".

== See also ==
- Empirical evidence
- Experiential learning
- Human self-reflection
- Kierkegaard
- Montaigne
- Qualia
- Tacit knowledge
