= CHRP (human resources) =

Canadian designation for human resources professionals

Certified Human Resources Professional (CHRP)
- Type: Professional Organization
- Location: Canada
- Website: www.hrpa.ca/hr-designations/chrp

Certified Human Resources Professional (CHRP) is a designation achieved by human resources professionals in Ontario.

As of October 2016, the CHRP designation outside of Ontario has been rebranded as the CPHR (Chartered Professional in Human Resources). The rebrand occurred after Ontario's provincial HR association, the HRPA (Human Resources Professional Association), left the national body, and unilaterally created a three-tiered designation for their province. They also relegated the formerly single-tier CHRP designation, to the entry-level tier of their system. This meant that the rest of Canada's HR associations had to either accept the HRPA's three-tiered model themselves or retain the nationally recognized CHRP designation under a different name. Established in 1994, the Chartered Professionals in Human Resources Canada is a collaborative effort of human resources associations in nationally, formerly known as Canadian Council of Human Resources Associations (CCHRA). In 2016, the CCHRA and the member associations agreed to change the national HR designation to CPHR, and the new entity CPHR Canada was created.
