= Human resource management =

Approach to the effective management of people in a company

Human resource management (HRM) is the strategic and coherent approach to the effective and efficient management of people in a company or organization. Human resource management is primarily concerned with the management of people within organizations, focusing on policies and systems. HR departments are responsible for overseeing employee-benefits design, employee recruitment, training and development, performance appraisal, and reward management, such as managing pay and employee benefits systems.

The overall purpose of human resources (HR) is to ensure that the organization can achieve success through people. HR professionals manage the human capital of an organization to maximize employee performance. They can specialize in finding, recruiting, selecting, training, and developing employees, as well as maintaining employee relations or benefits. Training and development professionals ensure that employees are trained and have continuous development. This is done through training programs, performance evaluations, and reward programs. Employee relations deals with the concerns of employees when policies are broken, such as in cases involving harassment or discrimination. Managing employee benefits includes developing compensation structures, parental leave, discounts, and other benefits. On the other side of the field are HR generalists or business partners.

HR is a product of the human relations movement of the early 20th century when researchers began documenting ways of creating business value through the strategic management of the workforce. It was initially dominated by transactional work, such as payroll and benefits administration, but due to globalization, company consolidation, technological advances, and further research, HR as of 2015 includes strategic initiatives like mergers and acquisitions, talent management, succession planning, industrial and labor relations, inclusion, employee retention and lowering employee turnover.

== History ==
=== Precedent theoretical developments ===
The human resources field began to take shape in 19th century Europe. It is built on a simple idea by Robert Owen (1771–1858) and Charles Babbage (1791–1871) during the Industrial Revolution. These men concluded that people were crucial to the success of an organization. They expressed the thought that well-being of employees led to perfect work; without healthy workers, the organization would not survive.

The term "human resource" was first coined by labor economist John R. Commons in 1893. HR emerged as a specific field in the early 20th century, influenced by Frederick Winslow Taylor (1856–1915). Taylor explored what he termed "scientific management" (sometimes referred to as "Taylorism"), striving to improve economic efficiency in manufacturing jobs. He eventually focused on one of the principal inputs into the manufacturing process—labor—sparking inquiry into workforce productivity.

Meanwhile, in London C S Myers inspired by unexpected problems among soldiers who alarmed generals and politicians. During the First World War, he co-founded the National Institute of Industrial Psychology (NIIP) in 1921. He set seeds for the human relations movement, this movement, on both sides of the Atlantic, built on the research of Elton Mayo (1880–1949) and others to document through the Hawthorne studies (1924–1932) and other studies how stimuli, unrelated to financial compensation and working conditions, could yield more productive workers. Work by Abraham Maslow (1908–1970), Kurt Lewin (1890–1947), Max Weber (1864–1920), Frederick Herzberg (1923–2000), and David McClelland (1917–1998) formed the basis for studies in industrial and organizational psychology, organizational behavior and organizational theory.

=== Birth and development of the discipline ===
By the time there was enough theoretical evidence to make a business case for strategic workforce management, changes in the business landscape—à la Andrew Carnegie (1835–1919) and John Rockefeller (1839–1937)—and in public policy—à la Sidney (1859–1947) and Beatrice Webb (1858–1943), Franklin D. Roosevelt and the New Deal of 1933 to 1939—had transformed employer-employee relationships, and the HRM discipline became formalized as "industrial and labor relations". In 1913 one of the oldest known professional HR associations—the Chartered Institute of Personnel and Development (CIPD)—started in England as the Welfare Workers' Association; it changed its name a decade later to the Institute of Industrial Welfare Workers, and again the next decade to Institute of Labour Management before settling upon its current name in 2000. From 1918 the early Soviet state institutions began to implement a distinct ideological HRM focus alongside technical management—first in the Red Army (through political commissars alongside military officers), later (from 1933) in work sites more generally (through partorg posts alongside conventional managers).

In 1920, James R. Angell delivered an address to a conference on personnel research in Washington detailing the need for personnel research. This preceded and led to the organization of the Personnel Research Federation. In 1922 the first volume of The Journal of Personnel Research was published, a joint initiative between the National Research Council and the Engineering Foundation. Likewise in the United States, the world's first institution of higher education dedicated to workplace studies—the School of Industrial and Labor Relations—formed at Cornell University in 1945. In 1948 what would later become the largest professional HR association—the Society for Human Resource Management (SHRM)—formed as the American Society for Personnel Administration (ASPA).

In the Soviet Union, Stalin's use of patronage exercised through the "HR Department" equivalent in the Bolshevik Party, its Orgburo, demonstrated the effectiveness and influence of human-resource policies and practices, and Stalin himself acknowledged the importance of the human resource, exemplified in his mass deployment of it, as in the five-year plans and in the Gulag system.

During the latter half of the 20th century, private-sector union membership in the U.S. declined significantly, while workforce-management specialists continued to expand their influence within organizations. In the U.S., the phrase "industrial and labor relations" came into use to refer specifically to issues concerning collective representation, and companies began referring to the proto-HR profession as "personnel administration." Many current HR practices originated with the needs of companies in the 1950s to develop and retain talent.

In the late 20th century, advances in transportation and communications greatly facilitated workforce mobility and collaboration. Corporations began viewing employees as assets. "Human resource management" consequently became the dominant term for the function, with the ASPA even changing its name to the Society for Human Resource Management (SHRM) in 1998.

"Human capital management" (HCM) is sometimes used synonymously with "HR", although "human capital" typically refers to a narrower view of human resources; i.e. the knowledge the individuals embody and can contribute to an organization. Other terms sometimes used to describe the HRM field include "organizational management", "manpower management", "talent management", "personnel management", "workforce management", and simply "people management".

=== In popular media ===
Several popular media productions have depicted human resource management in operation. The U.S. television series The Office, HR representative Toby Flenderson is sometimes portrayed as a nag because he constantly reminds coworkers of company policies and government regulations. Long-running American comic strip Dilbert frequently portrays sadistic HR policies through the character Catbert, the "evil director of human resources". An HR manager is the title character in the 2010 Israeli film The Human Resources Manager, while an HR intern is the protagonist in 1999 French film Ressources humaines. The main character in the BBC sitcom dinnerladies, Philippa, is an HR manager. The protagonist of the Mexican telenovela Mañana es para siempre is a director of human resources. Up In the Air is centered on corporate "downsizer" Ryan Bingham and his travels. As the film progresses, HR is portrayed as a data-driven function that deals with people as human resource metrics, which can lead to absurd outcomes for real people.

== Practice ==
=== Business function ===
Dave Ulrich lists the function of human resources as:

- Aligning human resource strategy and human resource metrics with business strategy
- Re-engineering organization processes
- Listening and responding to employees, and managing transformation and change.

At the macro level, HR is in charge of overseeing organizational leadership and culture. HR also ensures compliance with employment and labor laws and often oversees employee health, safety, and security. Labor laws may vary from one jurisdiction to the next. In a workplace administered by the federal government, HR managers may need to be familiar with certain crucial federal laws, in order to protect both their company and its employees. In the United States of America, important federal laws and regulations include:

1. Fair Labor Standards Act of 1938: It establishes a minimum wage and protects the right of certain workers to earn overtime.
2. Equal Employment Opportunity Act of 1972: It strengthens the Equal Employment Opportunity Commission's authority to prevent and address workplace discrimination and prohibits employers from making hiring, firing, or employment decisions based on race, color, religion, sex, national origin, or age.
3. Family and Medical Leave Act of 1993: It allows eligible employees to take up to twelve weeks of unpaid leave for family and medical reasons while ensuring they can return to their job afterward.
4. Immigration Reform and Control Act: It requires employers to verify the identity and employment eligibility of all employees, prohibits the hiring of unauthorized workers, and establishes penalties for employers who hire unauthorized aliens while protecting employees from discrimination based on nationality or citizenship, except for the "right to prefer equally qualified citizens".

An important responsibility of HR is to ensure that a company complies with all laws and regulations, thus protecting the company from legal liability. In circumstances where employees exercise their legal authorization to negotiate a collective bargaining agreement, HR will typically also serve as the company's primary liaison with employee representatives (usually a labor union). Consequently, the HR industry lobbies governmental agencies (e.g., in the United States, the United States Department of Labor and the National Labor Relations Board) to advance its priorities.

=== Functions of Human resource management ===
1. Staffing: The process of the recruitment and selection of employees through the use of interviews, applications and networking. Staffing involves two main factors. The first is to attract talented recruits who meet the organization's requirements, and doing so by using tools such as mass media; the second is to manage hiring resources. Managers can use hiring resources to exercise different strategies.
2. Training and Development: It involves a continuous process of training and developing competent and adapted employees. Here, motivation is seen as key to keeping employees highly productive. This includes employee benefits, performance appraisals, and rewards. Employee benefits, appraisals, and rewards are all encouragements to bring forward the best employees.
3. Maintenance: Involves keeping the employees' commitment and loyalty to the organization. Managing for employee retention involves strategic actions to keep employees motivated and focused so they remain employed and fully productive for the benefit of the organization. Some businesses globalize and form more diverse teams. HR departments have the role of making sure that these teams can function and that people can communicate across cultures and across borders. The discipline may also engage in mobility management, especially for expatriates; and it is frequently involved in the merger and acquisition process. HR is generally viewed as a support function to the business, helping to minimize costs and reduce risk.

Other Activities:

- Talent Acquisition: focuses on the long-term strategic planning required to identify, attract, and hire the top talent necessary to meet the organization's needs.
- Talent Recruitment: involves identifying, attracting, and hiring suitable candidates to fulfill specific job openings and meet business needs.
- Talent Management: helps organizations identify key positions vital for long-term success, develop a pool of high-potential employees to fill these roles, and establish a framework for managing performance, developing leaders, retaining talent, and fostering organizational commitment.
- Compensation and Benefits: design competitive compensation and benefits packages to attract and retain talent.
- Employee Relations: manage employee relations issues, such as conflict resolution, employee grievances, and workplace investigations.
- Training and Development: develop and implement training programs and professional development opportunities for their employees.
- Performance Management: a systematic process focused on enhancing organizational effectiveness according to the organization's tactical and strategic goals, using performance management systems and designing human resource metrics. Performance is considered a function of ability, motivation, and environment; hence, this approach provides employees with clear feedback on their performance outcomes and support areas for improvement, ensuring that active learning and cultural engagement take place in alignment with organizational objectives.
- Legal Compliance: ensure that organizations are compliant with labor laws and regulations, including employment standards, workplace safety, and anti-discrimination policies.

In startup companies, trained professionals may perform HR duties. In larger companies, an entire functional group is typically dedicated to the discipline, with staff specializing in various HR tasks and functional leadership engaging in strategic decision-making across the business. To train practitioners for the profession, institutions of higher education, professional associations, and companies have established programs of study dedicated explicitly to the duties of the function. Academic and practitioner organizations may produce field-specific publications. HR is also a field of research study that is popular within the fields of management and industrial/organizational psychology. One of the important goals of HRM is establishing with the notion of unitarism (seeing a company as a cohesive whole, in which both employers and employees should work together for its common good) and securing a long-term partnership of employees and employers with common interests.

=== Code of ethics ===
Code of ethics provides a framework for ethical behavior and professional conduct in HRM. It ensures integrity, fairness, and responsibility. Its function is to guide HR professionals and departments in upholding the rights, safety, and interests of all stakeholders. They are generally categorized into the following:

1. Duties to the Public: HR professionals must act ethically, lawfully, and with integrity. They should address illegal acts, uphold public trust, maintain competence, and engage in continuous professional development.
2. Duties to the Profession: HR professionals must uphold the reputation of the profession by avoiding misconduct, adhering to ethical codes, promoting a positive image, and cooperating with investigations or disciplinary processes.
3. Duties to Clients and Employers: HR professionals must prioritize the best interests of employers and clients, ensure impartiality, disclose conflicts of interest, maintain accurate records, and safeguard confidentiality.
4. Duties to Individuals: HR professionals must advance dignity, equity, and safety for all. They should respect privacy, avoid discrimination or harassment, report imminent risks of harm, and foster an inclusive workplace.
5. Overarching Duties: HR professionals must foster trust, respect, and fairness in all relationships. They must act impartially, comply with laws, promote diversity, and resolve disputes ethically and professionally.

== Modern HR practices ==
Technology has a significant impact on HR practices. Utilizing technology makes information more accessible within organizations, eliminates time doing administrative tasks, allows businesses to function globally, and cuts costs. The adoption of modern business practices and information technology has transformed HR practices in the following ways:

=== E-recruiting ===
Recruiting has mostly been influenced by information technology. In the past, recruiters relied on printing in publications and word of mouth to fill open positions. Human Resource professionals were not able to post a job in more than one location and did not have access to millions of people, causing the lead time of new hires to be drawn out and tiresome. With the use of e-recruiting tools, HR professionals can post jobs and track applicants for thousands of jobs in various locations all in one place. Interview feedback, background checks and drug tests, and onboarding can all be viewed online. This helps HR professionals keep track of all of their open jobs and applicants in a way that is faster and easier than before. E-recruiting also helps eliminate limitations of geographic location.

=== Human resources information systems ===
HR professionals generally handle large amounts of paperwork on a daily basis, ranging from department transfer requests to confidential employee tax forms. Forms must be on file for a considerable period of time. The use of human resources information systems (HRIS) has made it possible for companies to store and retrieve files in an electronic format for people within the organization to access when needed, thereby eliminating the need for physical files and freeing up space within the office. HRIS also allows for information to be accessed in a timelier manner; files can be accessible within seconds. Having all of the information in one place also allows for professionals to analyze data quickly and across multiple locations because the information is in a centralized location. Human resource analytics can improve human resource management.

=== Virtual management ===
Technology allows professionals to train new staff members in a more efficient manner. This gives employees the ability to access onboarding and training programs from virtually anywhere. This eliminates the need of organizing costly face-to-face training and onboarding sessions. It allows management's to provide necessary training for job success and monitor progress of their employees through virtual classrooms and computerized testing, predict the risk of employee turnover through data analysis, help HR to formulate relevant talent retention and incentive strategies, improve the personal development of the company, and maintain metrics that aid in performance management.

Virtual management also allows HR departments to quickly complete the necessary paperwork for large numbers of new employees and maintain contact with them throughout their entire professional cycle within the organization. Through virtual management, employees gain greater control over their learning and development, feel more engaged with the organizational culture, and can participate in training at a time and place of their choosing, helping them manage their work–life balance and reducing layoffs and turnover.

Human resource management can be decentralized, for example when line managers recruit and onboard new employees.

=== Employer of record ===
An Employer of Record (EOR) is an arrangement in which a third-party organization serves as the official employer for a company's workforce, handling various HR functions such as payroll, tax compliance, and employee benefits, while the client company retains day-to-day management of the workers. This arrangement eliminates the need for an organization to directly manage HRM matters, allowing it to focus on other priorities.

=== HRM consultancies ===
HRM consultancies are private organizations that offer tailored solutions through specialized expertise for a fee. They design customized human resource strategies and processes to address each company's unique needs. Their services include developing recruitment plans, compensation frameworks, training programs, and performance management systems, all aligned with specific HR practices and the organization's goals and culture. By acting as consultants, they provide targeted solutions that help businesses optimize their workforce and achieve organizational objectives in complex and evolving market conditions.

== Careers ==
There are half a million HR practitioners in the United States and millions more worldwide. The Chief HR Officer or HR Director is the highest ranking HR executive in most companies. He or she typically reports directly to the chief executive officer and works with the Board of Directors on CEO succession.

Within companies, HR positions generally fall into one of two categories: generalist and specialist. Generalists support employees directly with their questions, grievances, and work on a range of projects within the organization. They "may handle all aspects of human resources work, and thus require an extensive range of knowledge. The responsibilities of human resources generalists can vary widely, depending on their employer's needs." Specialists, conversely, work in a specific HR function. Some practitioners will spend an entire career as either a generalist or a specialist while others will obtain experiences from each and choose a path later. Human resource consulting is a related career path where individuals may work as advisers to companies and complete tasks outsourced from companies.

Some individuals with PhDs in HR and related fields, such as industrial and organizational psychology and management, are professors who teach HR principles at colleges and universities. They are most often found in Colleges of Business in departments of HR or Management. Many professors conduct research on topics that fall within the HR domain, such as financial compensation, recruitment, and training.

== Professional associations ==
There are a number of professional associations, some of which offer training and certification. The Society for Human Resource Management, which is based in the United States, is the largest professional association dedicated to HR, with over 285,000 members in 165 countries. It offers a suite of Professional in Human Resources (PHR) certifications through its HR Certification Institute. An international provider of specialized certifications is Academy to Innovate HR (AIHR). The Chartered Institute of Personnel and Development, based in England, is the oldest professional HR association, with its predecessor institution being founded in 1918.

Several associations also serve specific niches within HR. The Institute of Recruiters (IOR) is a recruitment professional association, offering members education, support and training. WorldatWork focuses on "total rewards" (i.e., compensation, benefits, work life, performance, recognition, and career development), offering several certifications and training programs dealing with remuneration and work–life balance. Other niche associations include the American Society for Training & Development and Recognition Professionals International.

A largely academic organization that is relevant to HR is the Academy of Management that has an HR division. This division is concerned with finding ways to improve the effectiveness of HR. The academy publishes several journals devoted in part to research on HR, including Academy of Management Journal and Academy of Management Review, and it hosts an annual meeting.

== Education ==
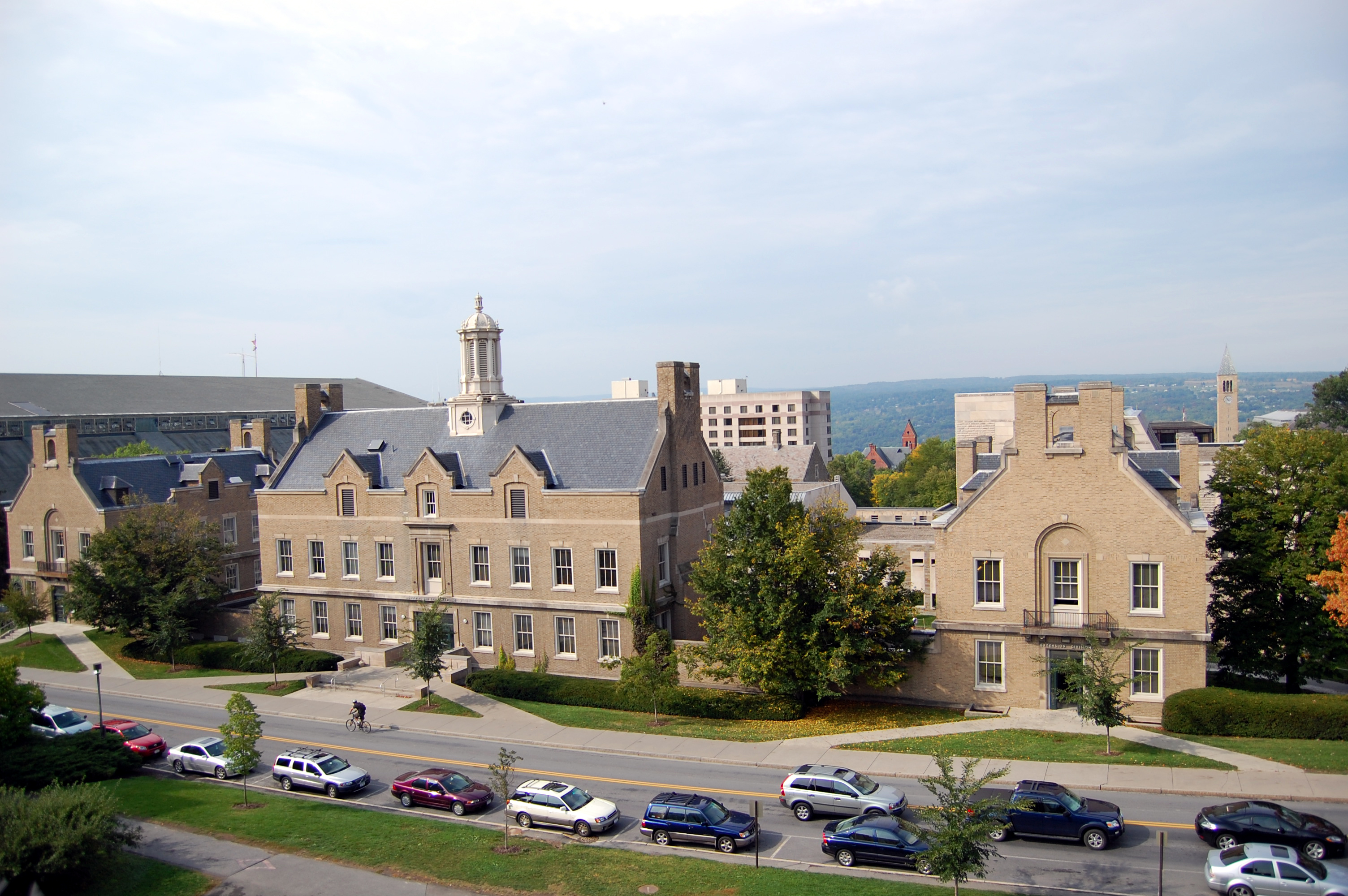
The School of Industrial and Labor Relations at Cornell University was the world's first school for college-level study in HR.

Some universities offer programs of study for human resources and related fields. The School of Industrial and Labor Relations at Cornell University was the world's first school for college-level study in HR. It currently offers education at the undergraduate, graduate, and professional levels, and it operates a joint degree program with the Samuel Curtis Johnson Graduate School of Management. In the United States of America, the Human Resources University trains federal employees.

Many colleges and universities house departments and institutes related to the field, either within a business school or in another college. Most business schools offer courses in HR, often in their departments of management. In general, schools of human resources management offer education and research in the HRM field from diplomas to doctorate-level opportunities. The master's-level courses include MBA (HR), MM (HR), MHRM, MIR, etc. (See Master of Science in Human Resource Development for curriculum.) Various universities all over the world have taken up the responsibility of training human-resource managers and equipping them with interpersonal and intrapersonal skills so as to relate better at their places of work. As Human resource management field is continuously evolving due to technology advances of the Fourth Industrial Revolution, it is essential for universities and colleges to offer courses which are future oriented.

== Theory and research ==
Ongoing research investigates the relationship between human resource management and performance and includes organization studies, industrial and organizational psychology, organizational theory and management science.

Human resource metrics are measurements used to determine the value and effectiveness of human resources (HR) initiatives, typically including such areas as turnover, training, return on human capital, costs of labor, and expenses per employee.

== ISO 30414 Human Resource Management Standard ==
This standard is the first global standard for human capital reporting and assessment.

It is stated in the introduction of the ISO 30414:2025 standard that, Human capital (HC) encompasses the collective knowledge, skills, and capabilities of an organization’s workforce, along with their profound influence on long-term performance and the attainment of competitive advantage through the optimization of organizational outcomes.

Effective measurement and transparent reporting of human capital empower organizations to better identify and manage the risks and opportunities tied to their most vital asset — their people. Studies indicate that intangible assets, primarily driven by human capital, often account for more than 90% of an organization’s overall value. Conversely, organizations that fail to proactively manage their human capital risk undermining their ability to create sustainable, long-term value.

== Journals ==
Academic and practitioner publications dealing exclusively with HR:

- Cornell HR Review
- HR Magazine (SHRM)
- Human Resource Management
- Human Resource Management Review
- International Journal of Human Resource Management
- Perspectives on Work (LERA)

Related journals:

- Academy of Management Journal
- Academy of Management Review
- Administrative Science Quarterly
- International Journal of Selection and Assessment
- Journal of Applied Psychology
- Journal of Management
- Journal of Occupational and Organizational Psychology
- Journal of Personnel Psychology
- Organization Science
- Personnel Psychology

== Criticism ==
A systematic review found a lack of clarity in conceptualization and measurement of human resource systems. The effect size of human resource management was found to decrease when correcting for past performance of employees.

Human resource management has been criticized of in some cases discrimination and algorithmic bias. Women were found over-represented in human resource management. A meta-analysis found systemic discrimination against men in recruitment since around 2009.

== See also ==
- People Operations
- Aspiration management
- Domestic inquiry
- Employment agency
- Human resource accounting
- Human resource management system
- Organization development
- Organizational theory
- Realistic job preview
- Recruitment
