= People Operations =

Organization's workforce

People operations, sometimes referred to as people ops, is a professional field and organizational function that deals with the management and development of employees, through various aspects of employment.

These include organizational culture, upskilling, compliance with labor law, hiring and onboarding, interpersonal relations, performance management, policy and process development, employee engagement, employee recognition, and working to ensure that a system of personal and professional development is maintained for all employees at a given organization.

People operations is a holistic reinvention of traditional human resources, and is tailored to a more modern workplace and work practices, such as remote roles and global teams. It aims to put people first in company decision-making.

While there is some overlap between human resources and people operations in terms of tasks and responsibilities, the overarching methodology of people ops is quite distinct. HR has historically been centered around policies, business goals, compliance with labor legislation, and payroll-related matters.

People ops, in contrast, focuses on organizational culture, learning and development (L&D), role fulfilment, recognition and reward, personal and professional development, interpersonal relations, successful interfacing between senior management and other employees, organizational values and identity, coaching and mentoring, employee engagement, and diversity, equity, and inclusion (DEI).

People operations positions itself as highly integrated across business departments, and aims to utilize a proactive, people-focused mindset to drive cultural cohesion, integration, career satisfaction, and employee retention. People ops takes the humanistic side of business administration, as well as the entire employee lifecycle (from hiring to departure) into consideration. In contrast to human resources, people operations seeks to focus on people's intrinsic value, and the ways that upskilling, rewarding, and keeping employees happy contribute directly to overall business success. People operations is therefore based on employee-driven growth.

In vernacular usage, people operations can refer to the people operations department of a business, or to the people operations field in which such practitioners work. Similar fields with a more specific focus, which may be situated underneath a people operations department, are employee experience and employee success.

Companies that have switched to using a people operations methodology, instead of traditional HR, include Google, IBM, Cloudflare, Yelp, Relativity Space, Propel, and Credible Labs.

== Activities ==
The people operations field is quite broad, and may vary in the size of its scope depending on a particular company's goals, or the needs of a specific role. However, in general, People ops is likely to cover the following functions:

- Crafting a positive, sustainable organizational culture
- Developing and maintaining a system of organizational values, and an organizational identity
- Ensuring a system of employee recognition is in place
- Implementing and managing a comprehensive performance review process
- Developing suitable business policies and processes
- Engaging with employees, for example via surveys
- Conducting coaching and mentoring of other senior employees, for matters relating to, for example, interpersonal relations, people management, succession planning, reward, and communication
- Tracking and improving upon diversity in the workplace
- Overseeing skills management, probation periods, and performance improvement plans
- Ensuring compliance with applicable local labor legislation
- Engaging in contract negotiations, salary benchmarking, promotions, and culture management in times of business change
- Managing the hiring, onboarding, and offboarding processes of a business
- Administrating people management systems
- Tracking salaries, and ensuring fair compensation and benefits
- Involvement in payroll and expense management
- Tracking various employee-related metrics, such as job satisfaction, churn, and performance
- Creating and maintaining a system of communication and feedback across departments
- Enabling and driving professional and personal development, through, for example, learning and development (L&D) programs and training

== See also ==
- Business administration
- Commerce
- Management
- Industrial and organizational psychology
- Industrial relations
- Worker's rights
