= Culture Amp =

Australian employee experience platform

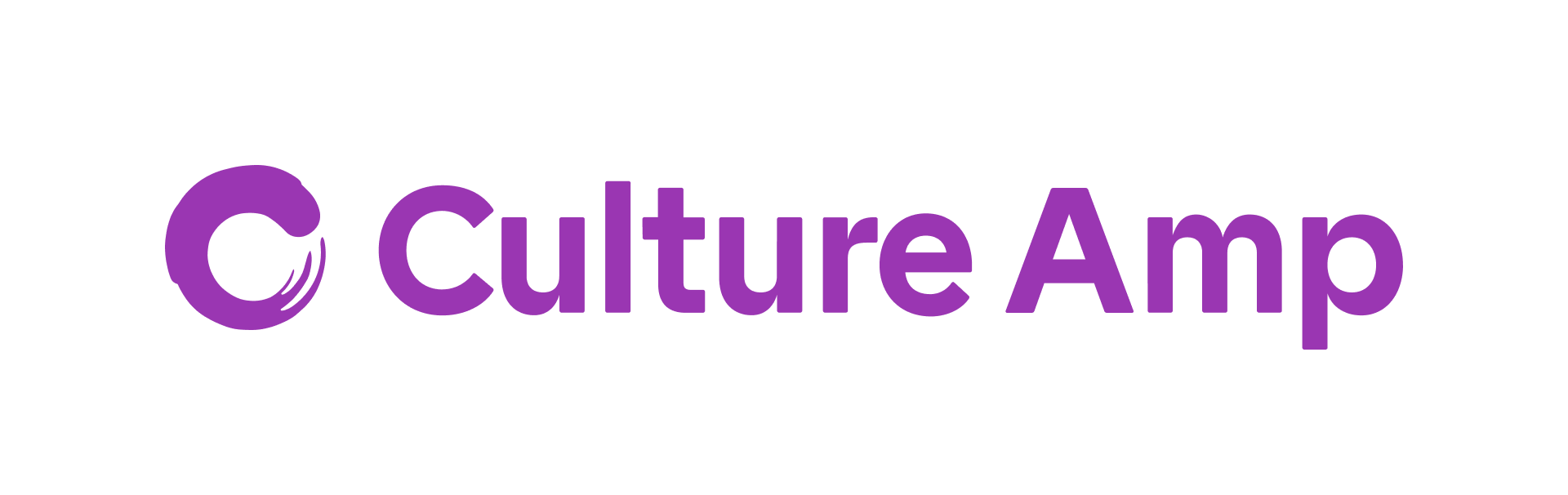
- Type: Private
- Industry: Software
- Founded: 2009; 17 years ago in Melbourne, Australia
- Founders: Didier Elzinga; Doug English; Rod Hamilton; Jon Williams
- Headquarters: Melbourne, Australia
- Area served: Worldwide
- Products: Culture Amp platform
- Services: Employee engagement software Performance management software Employee survey tool AI-powered coaching
- Website: cultureamp.com

Culture Amp is an Australian software company that provides software-as-a-service (SaaS) employee experience technology. The company is based in Melbourne, Australia with offices in the United States, United Kingdom, and Germany.

== History ==
Culture Amp was founded in 2009 by Didier Elzinga, Doug English, Rod Hamilton, and Jon Williams.

In 2015, Culture Amp received $6.3 million in Series A funding and opened its first international office in San Francisco.

In 2019, Culture Amp acquired Zugata, a performance management firm, in 2019.

After receiving additional funding and opening offices in New York and London between 2016-2020, Culture Amp closed a $150 million Series F round led by Sequoia Capital China and TDM Growth Partners, in July 2021. This raise valued the company at $1.5 billion.

In 2021, Disco, a cultural values recognition company, was acquired by Culture Amp.

In 2024, Culture Amp completed the acquisition of Orgnostic, a people analytics company.

== Platform ==
Culture Amp's cloud-based employee experience platform serves the needs of employee engagement and continuous performance management programs. Built on a foundation of people science research (such as organizational behavior and I/O psychology), Culture Amp enables human resources teams to capture employee feedback through employee engagement surveys, aggregate feedback data across individual departments, and benchmark it against the industry.

In 2025, Culture Amp launched AI Coach, an AI-powered performance and career coach for employees and leaders.
