= Klick (company) =

Health marketing agency

Klick Health
- Company type: Private
- Industry: Health marketing
- Founded: 1997
- Founders: Leerom Segal; Aaron Goldstein; Peter Cordy
- Headquarters: Toronto, Ontario, Canada
- Website: www.klick.com

Klick Health, also known as Klick, is a Canadian marketing agency focused on the health industry.

== History ==
Klick was founded in 1997. In 2017, the company launched a device called the SymPulse Tele-Empathy, which recorded and transmitted the symptoms and tremors of Parkinson's disease to doctors care providers.

In 2021, Klick, YouTube and London School of Hygiene & Tropical Medicine's Vaccine Confidence Project collaborated on a video series called "Community Unity" focusing on frequently asked questions about the COVID-19 vaccines.

== Operations ==
In 2006, Klick replaced its internal email systems with a messaging and project management software program called "Genome." Company co-founder Leerom Segal has claimed that the platform has improved productivity at Klick and helped with the agency's expansion. In an article for The Globe and Mail in 2014, Segal also felt that the platform was responsible for Klick's low turnover rate of three percent, compared to seven percent across Canadian employers. The system was marketed to external clients as SenseiOS.

The organizational structure of Klick Health has not included a human resources department, which was a point of concern for some employees. In 2023, Klick Labs, the research division of Klick, developed an artificial intelligence voice-based screening tool for type 2 diabetes.

Klick is described by the Yale School of Management as the "largest private health marketing company in the world".

== Awards ==
- Webby Award for its video for the "Kindness is Contagious" campaign from the Fred Rogers Center
- Multiple Clio Health Awards and Clio Health Independent Agency of the Year (2023, 2024)
