= Zhejiang Market Guide =

Simplified Chinese economic newspaper

- Native name: 浙江市场导报
- Type: Daily newspaper
- Publisher: Zhejiang Market Guide Agency
- Founded: July 2, 1992
- Language: Chinese
- Headquarters: Hangzhou
- OCLC number: 866048278
- Website: www.zjscdb.com

Zhejiang Market Guide (Chinese: 浙江市场导报), also known as Zhejiang Shichang Daobao or Zhejiang Market Herald, is an economic newspaper published in simplified Chinese in the People's Republic of China.

Sponsored by the Zhejiang Administration for Industry and Commerce (浙江省工商行政管理局), the newspaper was inaugurated in Hangzhou on July 2, 1992, and its predecessor was Zhejiang Industry and Commerce Herald (浙江工商导报).

== Controversies ==
On August 9, 2007, Beijing Sanmianxiang Copyright Agency Limited Company (北京三面向版权代理有限公司) sued Zhejiang Market Guide Agency (浙江市场导报社) on behalf of the article's author. The lawsuit required the electronic version of the Zhejiang Market Guide to stop the infringement, and at the same time pay the author's remuneration to Sanmianxiang Copyright Agency and make corresponding compensation. The court did not rule on this claim because the Zhejiang Market Guide Agency refused to mediate.

This case is the first copyright dispute over the electronic version of a newspaper in China, and attracted widespread attention and discussion from all sectors of Chinese society.
