= Rolf van Dick =

German psychologist

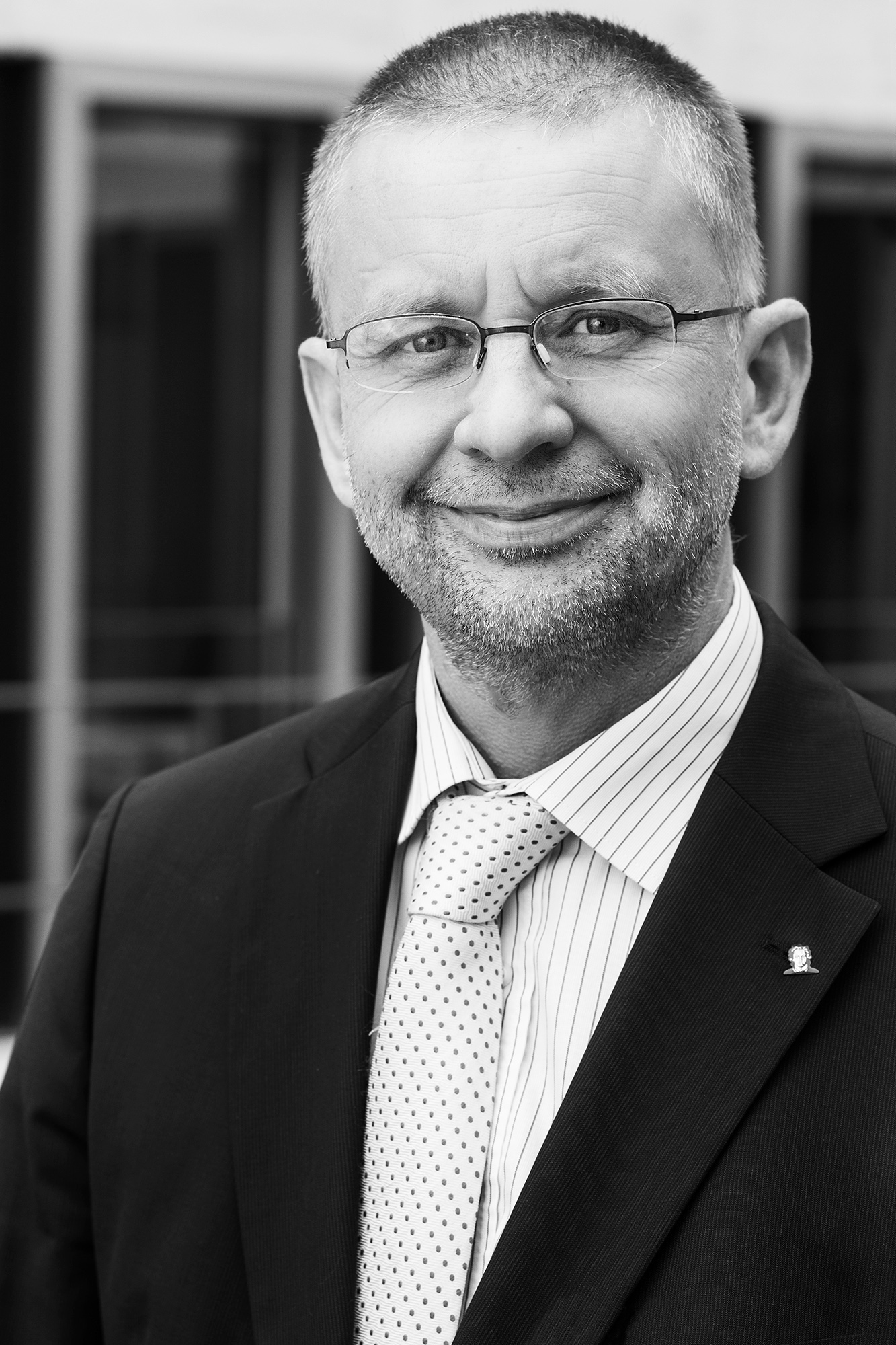
Rolf van Dick in 2013

Rolf van Dick (born 5 April 1967 in Duisburg) is a German social psychologist.

== Life ==
Van Dick graduated in psychology at the Philipps-University Marburg. He earned his Ph.D. in 1999 from Philipps-University Marburg, supervised by Ulrich Wagner. From 1995 to 2002, he was working as a lecturer and assistant professor at the Philipps-University Marburg. From 2003 to 2006, he worked at Aston University, Birmingham, England, first as a senior lecturer, and from 2005 to 2007 as a full professor and chair of Social Psychology and Organizational Behavior.

Since 2006, Van Dick has held the chair for Social Psychology at the Institute for Psychology at the Goethe University Frankfurt am Main (Germany) and also is teaching at Goethe Business School, Frankfurt. He has been a visiting professor in Beijing (Renmin University, 2016) and Shanghai (Jiao Tong University, 2016), Kathmandu (Nepal, 2009), Rhodes (University of the Aegean, Greece, 2002) and at the University of Alabama (Tuscaloosa, Alabama USA in 2001). At Goethe University, he was Director of the Institute of Psychology, and from 2011 to 2015 and again 2017/18 he served as Dean of the Department of Psychology and Sports Sciences. Currently he serves as Vice Dean (an office he also held from 2008 to 2011). From 2016 to 2018, he has held a Professorship at Oslo and Akershus University College of Applied Sciences, Work Research Institute (AFI), Norway and from 2016 to 2020 he was a member of the Psychology Review Board (Fachkollegium) of the German Science Foundation (DFG). In 2023, he became Henriette Herz-Scout at the Humboldt Foundation and has been appointed distinguished scholar at Lingnan University, Hongkong. Since 2026 Rolf van Dick, together with Michael Kosfeld leads Goethe Leadership Centre - an Institute of Advanced Studies, funded by the German Research Foundation.

From 2018 to 2021, he served as vice president at Goethe University, responsible for international affairs, early career researchers, diversity and equal opportunities. Van Dick is co-founder and Scientific Director of the Center for Leadership and Behavior in Organizations (CLBO) at Goethe University.

Van Dick has been involved in various editorial functions at the British Journal of Management (editor-in-chief), the European Journal of Work and Organizational Psychology (Associate Editor), and the Journal of Personnel Psychology (editor-in-chief) and The Leadership Quarterly (associate editor). Since 2022 he serves as Specialty Chief Editor for Employee Well-being and Health at Frontiers in Organizational Psychology. He has been a member of various editorial boards including the British Journal of Management, the European Journal of Work & Organizational Psychology, Group Processes and Intergroup Relations, the Journal of Business and Psychology, the Journal of Managerial Psychology, the Journal of Change Management, the Journal of Management Studies, the Journal of Organizational Behavior, Organizational Psychology Review, Organizacionnaâ psihologiâ (Organizational Psychology), Science You Can Use (SIOP/APA annual series), Social Psychology, The Leadership Quarterly, and the German journals Zeitschrift für Politische Psychologie, Zeitschrift für Personalpsychologie, Zeitschrift für Sozialpsychologie, and Zeitschrift für Arbeits- und Organisationspsychologie A & O.

== Research interests and awards ==
Among Van Dick's main research interests are inter- and intragroup-processes, especially the application of the social identity approach to diversity, leadership, mergers, teamwork, etc. Van Dick conducts his research in laboratory settings as well as in field studies or through cooperation with companies and schools. He has given over 300 talks at international conferences and in companies and other organizations and has published more than 70 books and book chapters and over 250 papers in academic outlets (such as Academy of Management Journal, Journal of Applied Psychology, Journal of Management, Journal of Marketing, Journal of Organizational Behavior, Journal of Vocational Behavior, and Journal of Personality and Social Psychology). He is also a regular contributor to practitioner outlets such as the German edition of the Harvard Business Manager.

In 2008, Van Dick was awarded with the University Teaching excellence award by the 1822-Foundation (German: Universitätspreis für exzellente Lehre der 1822-Stiftung). In 2009, 2016, 2019, and 2021 he was awarded the YAVIS price for excellent teaching at the Department of Psychology. In 2018, he was elected Fellow of the International Association of Applied Psychology (IAAP).

== List of publications (selection) ==
Papers

- Steffens, N.K., Peters, K., Haslam, S.A., & Van Dick, R. (2017). Dying for Charisma: Human inspirational appeal increases post-mortem. Leadership Quarterly, 28, 530–542. https://dx.doi.org/10.1016/j.leaqua.2016.09.001
- Van Dick, R., Ciampa, V., & Liang, S. (2018). Shared identity in organizational stress and change. Current Opinion in Psychology, 23, 20–25.
- Steffens, N.K., Haslam, S.A., Schuh, S.C., Jetten, J., & Van Dick, R. (2017). A meta-analytic review of social identification and health in organizational contexts. Personality and Social Psychology Review, 21, 305–335. doi: 10.1177/1088868316656701
- Richter, A., West, M.A., Van Dick, R., & Dawson, J.F. (2006). Boundary spanners’ identification, intergroup contact and effective intergroup relations. Academy of Management Journal, 49, 1252–1269.
- Ullrich, J., Christ, O., & Van Dick, R. (2009). Substitutes for procedural fairness: Prototypical leaders are endorsed whether they are fair or not. Journal of Applied Psychology, 94, 235–244.
- Schuh, S. C., Van Quaquebeke, N., Göritz, A., Xin, K. R., De Cremer, D., & Van Dick, R. (2016). Mixed feelings, mixed blessing? How ambivalence in organizational identification relates to employees’ regulatory focus and citizenship behaviors. Human Relations, 69, 2224–2249. DOI: 10.1177/0018726716639117
- Van Dick, R., & Kerschreiter, R. (2016). The social identity approach to effective leadership: An overview and some ideas on cross-cultural generalizability. Frontiers in Business Research in China, 10, 363–384. DOI 10.3868/s070-005-016-0013-3
- Zhang, X-a., Li, N., Ullrich, J., & Van Dick, R. (2015). Getting everyone on board: The effect of differentiated transformational leadership by CEOs on top management team effectiveness and leader-rated firm performance. Journal of Management, 41, 1898–1933. https://dx.doi.org/10.1177/0149206312471387

Book chapters

- Van Dick, R. & Haslam, S.A. (2012). Stress and well-being in the workplace: Support for key propositions from the social identity approach. In: J. Jetten, C. Haslam, & S.A. Haslam (eds.), The social cure: Identity, health, and well-being (pp. 175–194). Hove and New York: Psychology Press.
- Haslam, S.A. & Van Dick, R. (2011). A social identity analysis of organizational well-being. In D. De Cremer, R. Van Dick, & K. Murnighan, (eds.). Social psychology and organizations. New York: Taylor & Francis.
- Van Dick, R. & Monzani, L. (2017). Does it matter whether I am a happy and committed worker? The role of identification, commitment and satisfaction for employee behavior. N. Chmiel, M. Sverke & F. Fraccaroli (Eds.) An introduction to work and organizational psychology (3rd ed.; pp. 410–429). Oxford: Wiley.
- Sluss, D., van Dick, R., & Thompson, B. (2011). Role theory in organizations: A relational perspective. In S. Zedeck (Ed.), Handbook of I/O-Psychology (Vol. 1, pp. 505–534). Washington, DC: American Psychological Association.
- Van Dick, R. (2016). Organizational identification. In J. Meyer (Ed.) Handbook of Employee Commitment (pp. 106–118). Cheltenham: Edward Elgar.

Books

- De Cremer, D., Van Dick, R., & Murnighan, K. (Eds.). (2011). Social psychology and organizations. Taylor & Francis (Series in Organization and Management).
- Löwstedt, J., Larsson, P., Karsten, S., & Van Dick, R. (Eds.), (2007). From Intensified Work to Professional Development – A Journey through European schools. Brussels: PIE Lang.
- Van Dick, R. (2017). Identifikation und Commitment fördern. [Improving identification and commitment, 2nd revised and extended edition] Göttingen: Hogrefe.
- Felfe, J. & van Dick, R. (2024). (Hrsg.) Handbuch Mitarbeiterführung: Wirtschaftspsychologisches Praxiswissen für Fach- und Führungskräfte (2. Auflage). Berlin, Heidelberg: Springer.
- Van Dick, R. & West, M.A. (2013). Teamwork, Teamdiagnose und Teamentwicklung. [Teamwork, team analysis and team building, 2nd revised and extended edition] Göttingen: Hogrefe.
