= SymPulse =

SymPulse is a trademark of Klick Health, based in Toronto. SymPulse is a technology solution that represents the class of devices that performs digital symptom transference to build empathy for a physiological condition. The process involves identifying a symptom of a disease and using various technologies to sense and digitize the condition. This data is then used in conjunction with other technologies to elicit a physiological response representative of the symptom. The concept of eliciting empathy for a disease or symptom in someone that does not suffer that condition is known as teleempathy.

== Activity ==
=== Parkinson's disease / Movement disorders ===
Muscle activity data is collected from a Parkinson's disease patient's forearm and signal analysis is performed on the time series waveforms to extract and characterize the underlying tremor. Muscle stimulation technology is then used to generate sequences of impulses that stimulate muscles in a non-patient's forearm. The patent-pending experiential device induces involuntary muscle activity, which mimics patient tremors and enables physicians and caregivers to experience the difficulties of seemingly simple tasks, such as buttoning a shirt or using a mobile phone.

A preliminary study has demonstrated the effectiveness of this SymPulse device by enhancing the feelings of empathy toward Parkinson's disease patients in participants who wore the device versus participants who did not wear the device.
