= Realistic job preview =

Realistic job preview (RJP) is a tool companies and organizations use as a way to communicate the good and the bad characteristics of the job during the hiring process of new employees, or as a tool to reestablish job specificity for existing employees. Realistic job previews should provide the individuals with a well-rounded description that details what obligations the individual can expect to perform while working for that specific company. Descriptions may include, but are not limited to, work environment, expectations, and company policies (rules, restrictions).

== Purpose ==
At the heart of realistic job previews are the employee exchange or psychological contract between employer and employee. By being hired after use of the RJP, the employee enters the contract aware of what the organization will provide to them (pay, hours, schedule flexibility, culture, etc.) as well as what will be expected from them (late hours, stress, customer interaction, high urgency, degree of physical risk, etc.).

A realistic RJP is a job description that lets potential candidates know the details of the job they have applied for regarding pay, hours, schedule flexibility, and culture. The purpose of a hiring manager giving a realistic job preview is to make sure a new candidate/employee is fully aware of what the job entails. Realistic job previews help form bonds and build mutual trust with candidates, which leads to a lower turnover ratio, which is high with new hires. High turnover of new hires can occur when they are unpleasantly surprised by an aspect of their job, especially if that aspect is important to them (e.g. unpleasant working environments, inflexible schedule and unreasonable working hours). For example, if a new employee started a new job with an understanding that they wouldn't have to work weekends and then are immediately scheduled for a Saturday night, it undermines that trust and the psychological contract is breached. Better informed candidates who continue the application process are more likely to know what to expect and have the job to be a good fit while the ones who choose not to continue, save themselves time pursuing a job or company that wasn't right for them. Realistic job previews can save approximately $300,000 over a five-year period if it decreases turnover of one senior staff (employee) and one (entry) lower-level employee during the span of that five years, though the savings could be much greater depending on the size of the company. Receiving a detailed RJP plays a very important role in the socialization of new employees. RJPs also help influence the behaviors and attitudes of new hires, and is crucial when a new employee is starting in a new organization.

If the expectations and promises aren't met to the employee, it can cause dissatisfaction and lead to dysfunctional organizational outcomes. For example, if a company continuously overemphasizes its benefits, job outlooks etc., it will not meet up to the expectations it had previously set for itself, thus lowering trust, which can lead to turnover.

== Benefits and criticisms ==
Exchanging unrealistic expectations about a job with realistic expectations is beneficial because it can lower the initial expectations the individual has for the job, and enhances the ability to cope with the new job. By creating a realistic job preview, individuals indirectly develop an impression of the organization being honest and open to their potentially new employees. In turn, this improves the commitment of new employees as well as their initial job satisfaction. Thus, the hiring organization saves time by interviewing only the candidates with a strong chance of success.

Although many studies show that realistic job previews can also increase the drop-out rate for new candidates, other studies have shown that the effect they have on job acceptance is swayed by their job alternatives. An increased drop out rate is a good sign because it means that the realistic job preview gave them a reliable perspective on the position, and revealed that it would not have been something important enough for them to commit to. Yet, it has been shown that these effects are influenced by other job alternatives, which do not help predict job acceptance and commitment rates. Another criticism of realistic job preview is that it should not be used as a selection tool, but as a device for self-evaluation. Research has also pointed out that the nature of "realistic" information shared (in lab research or in the field) is unclear.

== Creating a RJP ==
There are no specific outlines or rules that one needs to follow in order to create a realistic job preview; the process can be simple or complicated. Generally, one will keep in mind the positive and negative aspects of that job as well as the basic overview. A realistic job preview can include concepts of the job that inform the future employee about things like goals, objectives and salary as well as being informative on the information and expectations of what that future employee is unlikely to know. Examples of this could include, but are not limited to, what is done during this job and why. Since an RJP informs the employee about details of a specific job, communicating the challenging or messy possibilities may also be included. Balancing out the pros and cons of the job to keep the employee interested in the position without giving them false expectations can help prevent any miscommunication. RJP information is focused on the things that matter most to the candidate's demographic and parts of the job or culture that correlate with engagement and turnover. Concluding the RJP with an overall image of the company's values, while including details will give the future employee something to think about and consider, such as if the companies values align with their goals or the culture is something they would mess in senselessly with.

A realistic job preview can be presented in a variety of ways. Length of the preview varies depending on the type of position the individual is applying and how it is presentation is dependent on the company, which could determine the situation at hand. Some approaches to explain the RJP are:

- On-The-Job footage (real employees not actors)
- Role plays
- Informative documents
- Scripted narrative
- Face-To-Face interviews

== See also ==
- Employee engagement
- Evaluation (workplace)
- Human resource management
- Job interview
- Leadership
- On boarding
- Organizational culture
- Performance management
- Recruitment
