= Human resource accounting =

Accounting for investments made in people

Human resource accounting (HRA) is the process of identifying and reporting investments made in the human resources of an organisation. These investments, which necessitate the specialty of human resource accounting because they are generally neglected by standard accounting, comprise the acts of hiring and paying human assets (employees and recruits when considered in terms of their economic value to the organisation) and are accounted for in order to achieve cost effective organizational objectives, monitor and evaluate the use of human resources, determine whether human assets are being conserved or depleted, and aid in the processes of management and decision-making. The cost approach of human resource accounting involves an acquisition cost model (the cost of acquiring an employee where there previously was not one) and a replacement cost model (the cost of replacing an employee), and the value approach models an organisation's predicted future earnings, its employees' future wages and its employees' values to the highest bidder in a competitive market.

== Objectives ==
Human resource accounting is intended to furnish cost value information for making proper and effective management decisions about acquiring, allocating, developing, and maintaining human resources in order to achieve cost effective organizational objectives; monitor effectively the use of human resources by the management. analyse the use of human assets, and whether they are conserved, depleted, or appreciated; and aid in the development of management principles and proper decision making for the future, by classifying the financial consequences of various practices.

== Methods ==
The first approaches to human development accounting were developed in 1691. The next approach was developed from 1691 to 1960, and the third phase was post-1960.

There are two approaches to HRA. Under the cost approach, also called the "human resource cost accounting method" or model, there is an acquisition cost model and a replacement cost model. Under the value approach, there is a present value of future earnings method, a discounted future wage model, and a competitive bidding model.

=== Cost approach ===
This approach is also called an acquisition cost model. This method measures the organization's investment in employees using the five parameters: recruiting, acquisition, formal training and familiarization, informal training and informal familiarization, and experience and development. This model suggests that instead of charging the costs to profit and loss statement (p&l) accounting, it should be capitalized in the balance sheet. The process of giving a status of asset to the expenditure item is called capitalization.

In human resource management, it is necessary to amortize the capitalized amount over a period of time. So, here one will take the age of the employee at the time of recruitment and at the time of retirement. Out of these, a few employees may leave the organization before attaining the superannuation. This method is the only method of Human Resource Accounting that is based on sound accounting principles and policies.

==== Limitations ====
- The valuation method is based on the false assumption that the dollar is stable.
- Since the assets cannot be sold there is no independent check of valuation.
- This method measures only the costs to the organization, but ignores completely any measure of the value of the employee to the organization.
- It is too tedious to gather the related information regarding human values.
- it may be possible that the employee is already fully trained and there is no need to incur any development, training, or recruitment costs. It will create difficulty for a company to find out CTC according to acquisition model.
- Does not account for software which can reduce the overall cost of human resources by having integrated software completing the tasks of staff.

=== Replacement cost approach ===
This approach measures the cost of replacing an employee. According to Likert (1985) replacement cost includes recruitment, selection, compensation, and training cost (including the income foregone during the training period). The data derived from this method could be useful in deciding whether to dismiss or replace the staff.

==== Limitations ====
- Substitution of replacement cost method for historical cost method does little more than update the valuation, at the expense of importing considerably more subjectivity into the measure. This method may also lead to an upwardly biased estimate because an inefficient firm may incur a greater cost to replace an employee (Cascio 3–4).

=== Present value of future earnings ===
Lev and Schwartz (1971) proposed an economic valuation of employees based on the present value of future earnings, adjusted for the probability of employees’ death/separation/retirement. This method helps in determining what an employee's future contribution is worth today.

==== Limitations ====
- The measure is an objective one because it uses widely based statistics such as census income return and mortality tables.
- The measure assigns more weight to averages than to the value of any specific group or individual (Cascio 4–5).

=== Value to the organization ===
Hekimian and Jones (1967) proposed that when an organization had several divisions seeking the same employee, the employee should be allocated to the highest bidder and the bid price incorporated into that division's investment base. For example, a value of a professional athlete's service is often determined by how much money a particular team, acting in an open competitive market, is willing to pay him or her.

==== Limitations ====
- The soundness of the valuation depends wholly on the information, judgment, and impartiality of the bidder (Cascio 5).

=== Expense model ===
According to Mirvis and Mac (1976), this model focuses on attaching dollar estimates to the behavioral outcomes produced by working in an organization. Criteria such as absenteeism, turnover, and job performance are measured using traditional organizational tools, and then costs are estimated for each criterion. For example, in costing labor turnover, dollar figures are attached to separation costs, replacement costs, and training costs.

=== Model on human resource accounting ===
This model prescribes the human resource accounting approach for two categories of employees:

- Employees, who are at strategic, key decision-making positions such as MD, CEO
- Employees, who execute the decision taken by Top Executives (Vice President, Directors)
- Model arrives value of human resources as the sum of below-mentioned three parts:
1. Real capital cost part
2. Present value of future salary/wages payments
3. Performance evaluation part

==== Limitations ====
1. Calculation process is lengthy and cumbersome.
2. Lev and Schwartz valuation principles have been used at one point of time, so this model contains a weakness from the Lev and Schwartz model.

Other limitations:

1. Ravindra Tiwari has prescribed another approach to value human resources at the time of annual appraisal exercise, which suggests valuation of human resources on different appraisal parameters.

== Limitations ==
Human resource accounting is the accounting methods, systems, and techniques, which coupled with special knowledge and ability, assist personnel management in the valuation of personnel in their knowledge, ability and motivation in the same organization as well as from organization to organization. It means that some employees become a liability instead of becoming a human resource. HRA facilitates decision making about the personnel, i.e. either to keep or to dispense with their services or to provide mega-training. There are many limitations that make the management reluctant to introduce HRA. Some of the attributes are:

1. There are no clear cut and specific procedures or guidelines for finding costs and value of human resources of an organization. The systems that are being adopted all have certain drawbacks.
2. The period of existence of human resources is uncertain and hence valuing them under uncertainty in the future seems to be unrealistic.
3. The much needed empirical evidence is yet to be found to support the hypothesis that HRA as a tool of management facilitates better and effective management of human resources.
4. Since human resources are incapable of being owned, retained, and utilized, unlike physical assets, this poses a problem to treat them as assets in the strict sense.
5. There is a constant fear of opposition from trade unions as placing a value on employees would make them claim rewards and compensations based on such valuations.
6. In spite of all its significance and necessity, tax laws don't recognize human beings as assets.
7. There is no universally accepted method of the valuation of human resources.
