= Exit interview =

Survey when somebody leaves an organisation

An exit interview is a survey conducted with an individual who is separating from an organization or relationship. Most commonly, this occurs between an employee and an organization, a student and an educational institution, or a member and an association. An organization can use the information gained from an exit interview to assess what should be improved, changed, or remain intact. More so, an organization can use the results from exit interviews to reduce employee, student, or member turnover and increase productivity and engagement, thus reducing the high costs associated with turnover. Some examples of the value of conducting exit interviews include shortening the recruiting and hiring process, reducing absenteeism, improving innovation, sustaining performance, and reducing possible litigation if issues mentioned in the exit interview are addressed.

The exit interview fits into the separation stage of the employee life cycle (ELC). This stage, the last one of the ELC, spans from the moment an employee becomes disengaged until their departure from the organization. This is the key time that an exit interview should be administered because the employee's feelings regarding their departure are fresh in mind. An off-boarding process allows both the employer and employee to properly close the existing relationship so that company materials are collected, administrative forms are completed, knowledge base and projects are transferred or documented, feedback and insights are gathered through exit interviews, and any loose ends are resolved.

== In business ==
Exit interviews in business are focused on employees that are leaving a company or when employees have completed a significant project. The purpose of this exit interview is to gain feedback from employees in order to improve aspects of the organization, better retain employees, and reduce turnover. During this interview employees will be asked why they are leaving, what specifically influenced their decision to leave, whether or not they are going to another company and what that company they are going to offers that their current company does not. Businesses can use this information to better align their HR strategy with what employees look for in an organization and enact programs and practices that will influence top talent to stay at the organization.

In the past, exit interview data was being collected by the organization but not much was being done in terms of interpreting the data and making it actionable. Today there are metrics, analytics, benchmarks, and best practices that help organizations make sense of and use the data towards proactive organizational retention programs. Recently an array of exit interview software has been developed and popularized. However this method of conducting exit interviews has some significant flaws, most notably, that it identifies the wrong drivers of staff turnover.

=== Common questions ===
Common questions include reasons for leaving, job satisfaction, frustrations, and feedback concerning company policies or procedures. Questions may relate to the work environment, supervisors, compensation, the work itself, and the company culture.

Examples:

- "What are your main reasons for leaving?"
- "What did you like most/least about the organization?"
- "What, if improved, would have caused you to stay at the organization?"
- "Would you recommend the organization to others as a good place to work?

How satisfied were you with your role and responsibilities? Did you feel adequately supported in your professional growth and development? Were there any challenges or areas of dissatisfaction? If yes, please elaborate. Did you feel a sense of belonging within the team and organization? Were there any aspects of the working environment that negatively affected your experience? How would you rate the work environment and culture? How would you describe the effectiveness of your immediate supervisor? Did you receive sufficient feedback and recognition for your work? Were your goals and expectations aligned with the organization’s vision? Were there any communication gaps or challenges within the team or organization? Did you have ample opportunities for collaboration and cross-functional interaction? How would you rate the company’s communication and feedback mechanisms? Did you find the company’s policies and procedures fair and equitable? Were there any policies or practices that you felt were hindering productivity or employee satisfaction? How would you rate the organization’s support for maintaining a healthy work-life balance? Were you able to manage personal commitments alongside your work responsibilities? Were you satisfied with your salary and benefits package? Did the organization provide fair recognition and rewards for your contributions?

Exit interviews play a pivotal role in understanding the dynamics of employee turnover and enhancing organizational success. By asking the right questions and effectively interpreting the data, organizations can make informed decisions to improve workplace culture, boost employee satisfaction, and drive long-term success.

=== Completion rates ===
Exit interview participation rates vary depending on the method used to conduct the exit interviews. Passive methods of data collection such as online or paper surveys have the lowest participation rates of around 30%. Involving a human being in the process increases the average participation rate to 50%. Outsourcing the exit interview process, while a relatively recent development, achieves the highest participation rates of 90% or more.

Completion rates often vary according to employee type with white collar employees generally having higher completion rates than blue collar employees or field based workers or others who are not office based (e.g. on mining sites, in hospitals). However, there are some exceptions to this.

Among active exit interview practices (conducted by human beings), participation rates are also affected by who it is that does the interviewing. If the direct manager of the departing employee conducts the interview, only 26% of organisations achieve completion rates of 90% or more. If junior or administrative Human Resources staff conduct the interview, only 31% achieve completion rates of over 90%. Outsourced consultants, HR Managers (or equivalent HR professionals), and indirect managers achieve higher participation.

== In education ==
Exit interviews in education are conducted with students who have graduated from an educational institution. These interviews are meant to gather information about students' experience while attending that institution, what they benefited from, what was missing, and what could be improved to enhance the experience of the next generation of students who attend that institution. This type of interview can also point to areas in which the institution should invest more or less resources to enhance a student's learning and development experience.

== Customers ==
A less common practice is conducting exit interviews with high value or long term customers, for example customers of aged care facilities.

== Associations ==
Exit interviews in associations are administered to members who decide to end membership with an association. These interviews provide feedback to an association regarding what caused the member to leave, what can be improved, and how resources can better be allocated.

== Other types ==
During elections, pollsters may conduct random exit polls.

== Methods for conducting exit interviews ==
There are various methods of conducting exit interviews, each with their benefits and disadvantages.

=== Face to Face interview ===
Historically, this has been the primary method for conducting exit interviews (79% of organisations), although this is changing rapidly. These face to face meetings are usually conducted internally by a human resources professional or manager, or in rare cases, by an external consultant.

==== Benefits ====
The main benefit of this method is that completion rates tend to be high, as long as the interview is conducted by a relevant and suitably skilled professional (external consultant, HR professional or indirect manager). In addition, departing employees have a personal experience which may cause them to speak more positively about the company (affecting their 'employer brand') after they leave. Also, if interviewers are well trained, the content can be well structured and checked in real time to ensure accuracy of data, especially concerning reasons for leaving. This method also allows high quality data to be collected from people whose literacy skills are not good.

==== Disadvantages ====
The disadvantages of this method are that the feedback is rarely captured in a way that allows reporting on trends with more than a third of organisations using this method having no reporting tool attached to their exit data. If conducted by an external consultant, this method can be expensive. It's also sometimes the case that the human resources professional who might conduct the interview, could be part of the employee's reason for leaving (e.g. I was overlooked in the pay review while on parental leave and my HR person wouldn't return my calls). This would mean that the employee is unlikely to be honest if that HR professional was conducting the exit interview. Unfortunately very few organisations (20%) provide any training on exit interviewing so the quality is often highly variable. In addition, this method is the most expensive if outsourced.

=== Telephone interviews ===
Exit interviews conducted by telephone are becoming more common (41% of organisations) and are the most effective method of exit interviews.

==== Benefits ====
Feedback is easy to capture and code in a form that allows easy reporting and analysis. Because the interviewer's visual attention does not need to be dedicated to the person in front of them, as it does in a face to face interview, they are able to capture and code feedback in real time. Completion rates are the highest of all methods, possibly due to there being no need for the interviewer and interviewee to be in the same physical place, but also because the interview can be conducted even after the person has left. If interviewers are well trained, the content can be well structured and checked in real time to ensure accuracy of data, especially concerning reasons for leaving. And as with face to face interviews, the experience for the interviewee can be very personal. This method is easy to outsource, and is less expensive than face to face interviews. It also allows for high quality data to be collected from people whose literacy skills are not good.

==== Disadvantages ====
This method is that it is more expensive than online and paper surveys. Some human resources professionals enjoy conducting the interviews, so outsourcing the interviews removes this task.

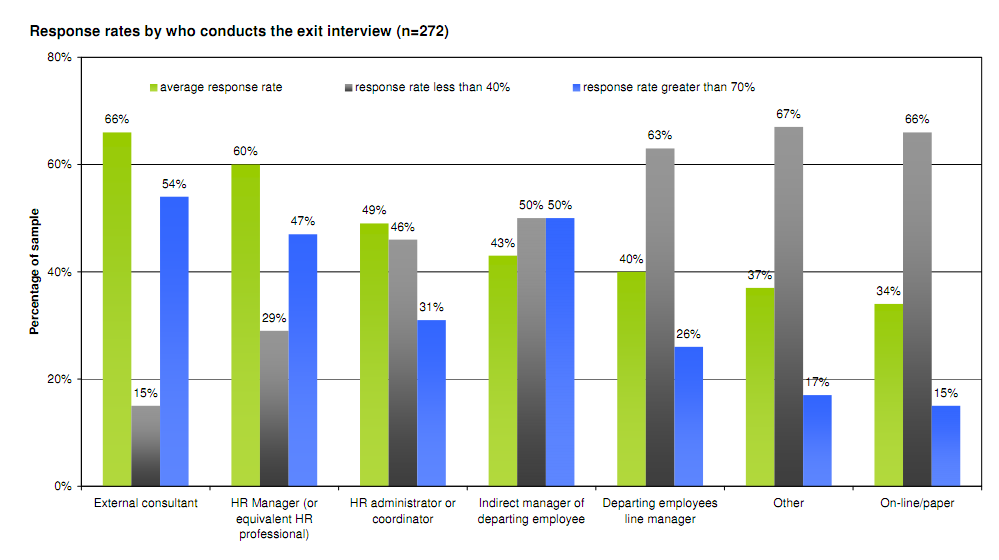
Percent of exit interviews completed according to who conducted the interview.

=== Paper surveys ===
Exit interviews taken in paper form allows interviews to be conducted with those who do not have Internet access, and allows for the option of anonymity. However, it takes longer to receive feedback, and respondents who are not literate would find it difficult to use this medium. Information must also be entered into a tracking system manually for this medium. As at 2010, 46% of organisations still conducted exit interviews using this method.

=== Online surveys ===
As at 2010, 38% of organisations used this method for exit interviews.

==== Benefits ====
This is the least costly method of conducting exit interviews, with several free survey software tools available on the market. It also collects data in a way that is easy to report and analyse.

==== Disadvantages ====
There are two significant problems with using online surveys for exit interviews. The most critical problem is that they identify the wrong drivers of staff turnover Because online surveys do not allow for testing of root cause, the reasons for leaving are not differentiated from issues that caused dissatisfaction but not resignation. In addition there is no ability to ensure that the commentary for each reason for leaving, is consistent with the reason for leaving option they have chosen from a list. The second problem with using online surveys for exit interviews is the relatively low completion rate at 34%. This is around half the average completion rate of interviews that are outsourced to external consultants (66%) and around a third of best practice for outsourcing phone interviews (95%).

=== Interactive voice response surveys ===
Interactive voice response surveys are reliable methods of taking exit interviews because they are accessible by phone, a very widespread and reliable technology. However, IVRs have fallen out of favor due to the cost effectiveness of web based options that yield data at similar or higher quality. In comparison to other options, it is difficult to get rich data from an IVR, or to adjust and change it, since any changes require new voice recordings to be made.

== Timing of exit interviews ==
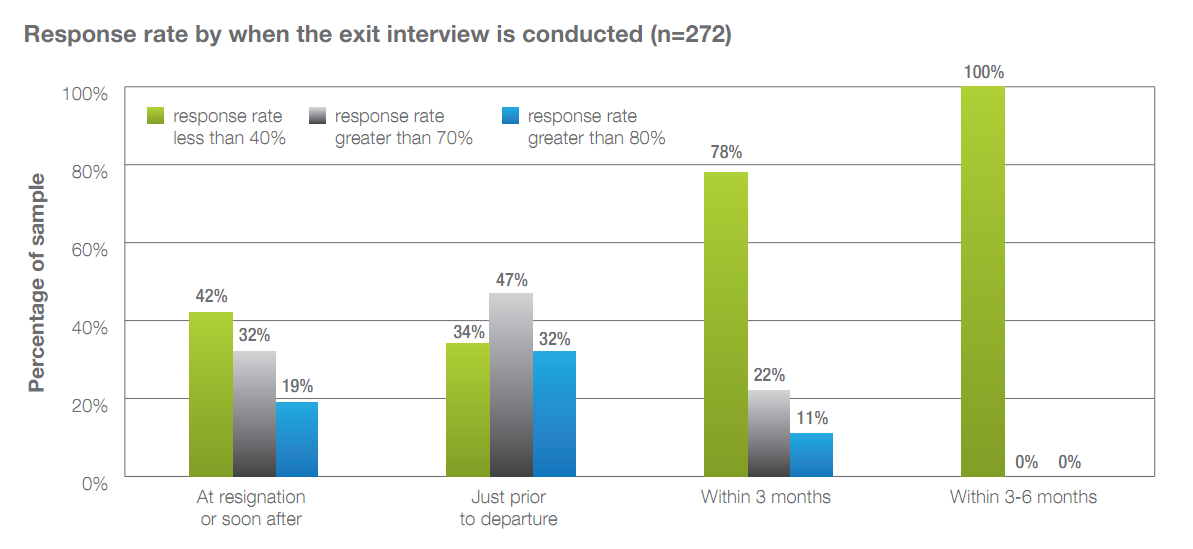
Percent of exit interviews completed according to timing of the interview.

The timing of exit interviews has a big impact on the completion rate. Organisations that conduct exit interviews in the week prior to departure were more likely to achieve completion rates of 80%+ (32% of these organisations). Conducting them too early is less effective with only 19% of companies achieving high completion. Leaving the interview until after the employee has left, results in very poor completion rates with only 11% achieving 80% or more.
