= Reward management =

Implementation of reward in an organisation

Reward management is concerned with the formulation and implementation of strategies and policies that aim to reward people fairly, equitably and consistently in accordance with their value to the organization.

Reward management consists of analysing and controlling employee remuneration, compensation and all of the other benefits for the employees. Reward management aims to create and efficiently operate a reward structure for an organisation. Reward structure usually consists of pay policy and practices, salary and payroll administration, total reward, minimum wage, executive pay and team reward.

== History ==
Reward management is a popular management topic. Reward management was developed on the basis of psychologists' behavioral research. Psychologists started studying behavior in the early 1900s; one of the first psychologists to study behavior was Sigmund Freud and his work was called the Psychoanalytic Theory. Many other behavioral psychologists improved and added onto his work. With the improvements in the behavioral research and theories, psychologists started looking at how people reacted to rewards and what motivated them to do what they were doing, and as a result of this, psychologists started creating motivational theories, which is very closely affiliated with reward management.

Defining motivation as "the degree to which an individual wants and choose to engage in certain specific behaviours", to which Vroom (quoted in Mitchell, 1982) adds that performance = ability x motivation. To have an efficient Reward System then, is mandatory that employees know exactly what their task is, have the skills to do it, have the necessary motivation and work in an environment allowing the transformation of intended actions into an actual behaviour. From the company point of view instead, an effective performance appraisal has to be present, in order to let motivation be a major contributor to the rewarded performance.

== Objective ==
Reward management deals with processes, policies and strategies which are required to guarantee that the contribution of employees to the business is recognized by all means. Objective of reward management is to reward employees fairly, equitably and consistently in correlation to the value of these individuals to the organization. Reward systems exist in order to motivate employees to work towards achieving strategic goals which are set by entities as well as aligning the actions of employees to reflect the culture, aims and beliefs a business or organisation wishes to uphold. Reward management is not only concerned with pay and employee benefits. It is equally concerned with non-financial rewards such as recognition, training, development and increased job responsibility. Ultimately, Reward Management is a tool that uses various types of Employee Motivation to align the strategic and cultural goals of an employee, or group of employees, with the tactical targets set by a business or organisation.

Kerr (1995) brings to attention how Reward Management is an easily understandable concept in theory, but how its practical application results often differ. The author, in fact, points up how frequently the company creates a Reward System hoping to reward a specific behaviour, but ending up rewarding another one. The example made is the one of a company giving an annual merit increase to all its employees, differentiating just between an "outstanding" (+5%), "above average" (+4%) and "negligent" (+3%) workers. As the difference between the percentage increasing was so slight, what the company obtained from the employees was indifference to the extra percentage point for a superlative job or the loss of one point for an irresponsible behaviour. In the following table other common management errors are summarised.

Güngör (2011) discusses Reward Management Systems and its applications within organisations. A firms Reward Management System may contain the organisation's processes, practices and policies which correspond to the employees contributions or abilities. The application of these are the relevant types of rewards which are given out to those who meet the criteria of the system. This study in to employee performance found a significant and positive relationship between Reward Management Systems and Employee performance

== Types of rewards ==
Rewards serve many purposes in organisations. They serve to build a better employment deal, hold on to good employees and to reduce employee turnover.

The principal goal is to increase people's willingness to work in one's company, to enhance their productivity and align their actions with the strategic goals and cultural beliefs of the Organisation or Business.

In its simplest form, reward is composed of three fundamental pillars. These being, Basic Pay, Variable Pay and Benefits. The first fundamental of reward begins with basic pay or salary. This is an agreed upon amount of money, awarded to an employee in exchange for an agreed upon service, outlined within the relevant employment contract or Earnings Based Agreement (EBA). Basic pay is fixed, consistent and guaranteed. Another form of reward is variable pay. Variable pay in a traditional sense is a performance-based method of reward and can take many forms. Unlike basic pay, variable pay may be inconsistent as suggested by its name. Variable pay may be linked to factors such as output, attitude, or other Key Performance Indicators. Variable pay may come in the form of commissions, bonus's, or profit-sharing plans. Benefits are also used as a reward. Benefits are tangible items that may include company vehicles, shares in the company or holiday pay entitlements to incentivise employees. However, These three pillars of reward only apply to one kind of reward, extrinsic reward.

- Extrinsic rewards: concrete rewards that employees receive.
  - Salary: A fixed payment amount, delivered on a consistent basis in exchange for the service provided to a business or organisation.
  - Bonuses: Usually annually, Bonuses motivates the employee to put in all endeavours and efforts during the year to achieve more than a satisfactory appraisal that increases the chance of earning several salaries as lump sum. The scheme of bonuses varies within organizations; some organizations ensure fixed bonuses which eliminate the element of asymmetric information, conversely, other organizations deal with bonuses in terms of performance which is subjective and may develop some sort of bias which may discourage employees and create setback. Therefore, managers must be extra cautious and unbiased.
  - Salary raise: Is achieved after hard work and effort of employees, attaining and acquiring new skills or academic certificates and as appreciation for employees duty (yearly increments) in an organization. This type of reward is beneficial for the reason that it motivates employees in developing their skills and competence which is also an investment for the organization due to increased productivity and performance. This type of reward offers long-term satisfaction to employees. Nevertheless, managers must also be fair and equal with employees serving the organization and eliminate the possibility of adverse selection where some employees can be treated superior or inferior to others.
  - Gifts: Are considered short-term. Mainly presented as a token of appreciation for an achievement or obtaining an organizations desired goal. Any employee would appreciate a tangible matter that boosts their self-esteem for the reason of recognition and appreciation from the management. This type of reward basically provides a clear vision of the employee's correct path and motivates employee into stabilising or increasing their efforts to achieve higher returns and attainments. Monetary gifts, such as Gift cards are also more likely to be used for luxury purchases and can build an emotional bond with the organisation.
  - Promotion: Quite similar to the former type of reward. Promotions tend to effect the long-term satisfaction of employees. This can be done by elevating the employee to a higher stage and offering a title with increased accountability and responsibility due to employee efforts, behaviour and period serving a specific organization. This type of reward is vital for the main reason of redundancy and routine. The employee is motivated in this type of reward to contribute all his efforts in order to gain managements trust and acquire their delegation and responsibility. The issue revolved around promotion is adverse selection and managers must be fair and reasonable in promoting their employees.
  - Intrinsic reward: are satisfaction one gets from the job itself. these may include having pride in one's work, having a feeling of accomplishment or being part of the team programmes like job enrichment, shorter working weeks, flex time and job rotation that provide interesting and challenging jobs can also offer intrinsic rewards.
  - Non financial reward: are desirable things that are at the disposal of the organisation for employees. These rewards don't increase the employee's financial well-being but instead make the employee's life on the job more attractive. Some of these rewards may include a carpeted floor, a large walnut desk, a private bathroom, impressive job title and reserved parking.
  - Other kinds of tangible rewards

Studies have proven that salespeople prefer pay raises because they feel frustrated by their inability to obtain other rewards, but this behaviour can be modified by applying a complete reward strategy. A method of applying a complete reward strategy is by pairing the use of extrinsic rewards with that of intrinsic rewards.

- Intrinsic rewards: tend to give personal satisfaction to an individual.
  - Information / feedback: Also a significant type of reward that successful and effective managers never neglect. This type of rewards offers guidance to employees whether positive (remain on track) or negative (guidance to the correct path). This also creates a bond and adds value to the relationship of managers and employees.
  - Recognition: Is recognizing an employee's performance by verbal appreciation. This type of reward may take the presence of being formal for example meeting or informal such as a "pat on the back" to boost employees self-esteem and happiness which will result in additional contributing efforts.
  - Trust/empowerment: in any society or organization, trust is a vital aspect between living individuals in order to add value to any relationship. This form of reliance is essential in order to complete tasks successfully. Also, takes place in empowerment when managers delegate tasks to employees. This adds importance to an employee where his decisions and actions are reflected. Therefore, this reward may benefit organizations for the idea of two minds better than one.

Intrinsic rewards makes the employee feel better in the organization, while Extrinsic rewards focus on the performance and activities of the employee in order to attain a certain outcome. The principal difficulty is to find a balance between employees' performance (extrinsic) and happiness (intrinsic).

Regardless of the form, the reward needs to be tailored according to the employee's personality. For instance, a sports fan will be really happy to get some tickets for the next big match. However a mother who passes all her time with her children, may not use them and therefore they will be wasted.

When rewarding one, the manager needs to choose if he wants to rewards an individual, a team or a whole organization. One will choose the reward scope in harmony with the work that has been achieved.

- Individual
  - Base pay, incentives, benefits
  - Rewards attendance, performance, competence
- Team: team bonus, rewards group cooperation
- Organization: profit-sharing, shares, gain-sharing

== Motivation theories ==
An interpretation of Maslow's hierarchy of needs, represented as a pyramid with the more basic needs at the bottom

Motivational theories are split into two groups as process and content theories. A basic definition of motivation in employees is the capability to change behaviour and the drive that holds one to act towards some goal. Content theories endeavor to name and analyze the factors which motivate people to perform better and more efficiently while process theories concentrate on how different types of personal traits interfere and impact the human behavior. Content theories are highly related with extrinsic rewards, things that are concrete like bonuses and will help improve employees' physiological circumstances whereas process theories are concerned with intrinsic rewards, such as recognition and respect, which will help boost employees confidence in the work place and improve job satisfaction.

A famous content theory would be Maslow's Hierarchy of Needs, and a famous process theory would be the equity theory.

Theories of motivation provide a theoretical basis for reward management though some of the best known ones have emerged from the psychology discipline. Perhaps the first and best known of these comes from the work of Abraham Maslow. Maslow's Hierarchy of Needs describes a pyramid comprising a series of layers from at the base the most fundamental physiological needs such as food, water, shelter and sex, rising to the apex where self-actualisation needs included morality and creativity. Maslow saw these levels of needs being fulfilled one at a time in sequence from bottom to top. Employment and the resources it brings are classed under 'safety needs' (level 2) while the workplace may also contribute to a sense of 'belonging' (level 3) and recognition at work can satisfy the need for 'self-esteem' (level 4).

Frederick Herzberg's motivator-hygiene theory, first published in 1959, argues that an employee's job satisfaction or dissatisfaction is influenced by two distinct sets of factors and also that satisfaction and dissatisfaction were not at opposite ends of the same continuum but instead needed to be measured separately. The two sets of factors are motivator factors and hygiene factors. According to Herzberg, real motivation comes from the work itself, from completing tasks, while the role of reward is to prevent dissatisfaction arising.

Expectancy theory is the theory which posits that we select our behaviour based on the desirability of expected outcomes of the action. It was most prominently used in a work context by Victor Vroom who sought to establish the relationship between performance, motivation and ability and expressed it as a multiplicative one – where performance equals motivation x ability. There are a lot of attractions for this kind of approach, particularly for employers who can target their motivation effort and anticipate a definable mathematical return for them. As this is a cognitive process theory it relies on the way employees perceive rewards These three theories plus variants of them have been used in countless research studies and continue to inform the practice of reward management up to the present day.

== Job evaluation ==
Job evaluation is closely related to reward management. It is important to understand and identify a job's order of importance. Job evaluation is the process in which jobs are systematically assessed to one another within an organization in order to define the worth and value of the job, to ensure the principle of equal pay for equal work. In the United Kingdom, it is now illegal to discriminate workers' pay levels and benefits, employment terms and conditions and promotion opportunities. Job evaluation is one method that can be adopted by companies in order to make sure that discrimination is eliminated and that the work performed is rewarded with fair pay scales. This system carries crucial importance for managers to decide which rewards should be handed out by what amount and to whom. Job evaluation provides the basis for grading, pay structure, grading jobs in the structure and managing job and pay relativities.

It has been said that fairness and objectivity are the core principles using an assessment of the nature and size of the job each is employed to carry out.

There are many different methods of job evaluation which can be used, but the three simplest methods are ranking, classification and factor comparison. However, there are more complex variations of methods such as the point method which uses scales to measure job factors. This method does not rank employees against one another but looks at the job as a whole.

Acas has stated that there were five main reasons why employers look at performing a job evaluation. These include: When deciding on a pay scale: Making sure that the current system is fair and equal for employees, Deciding on benefits such as bonuses, Comparing pay against other companies and reviewing all jobs after a major company pay change. Employees need to feel that they are being paid a fair wage compared to the same job with the competition. If this is true it may help reduce staff turnover which is very beneficial for employers as it reduces the cost of hiring new staff.

Research regarding job evaluation has mainly been conducted using qualitative data collection methods such as interviews, large scale surveys and basic experimental methods. Therefore, there is a large gap for research on job evaluation collecting quantitative data for a more statistical analysis. A comparison between public and private sectors and the methods of job evaluation is another area that should be considered for further research.

The effectiveness of an organization's performance and reward management system can have a significant impact on employee motivation, morale, and ultimately, their productivity. According to a 2008 study, a poorly designed or implemented reward system can lead to counterproductive behaviour and ultimately undermine the goals of the organisation. However, the "path-goal model" highlights a positive relationship between a well-designed reward system and employee performance. This model suggests that if employees perceive high productivity as a path to achieving their personal goals, they are more likely to be more productive, whereas if they perceive low productivity as a path to their goals, they are more likely to be less productive or even counterproductive. In other words, a well-designed reward system can motivate employees to increase their effort and productivity by rewarding their previous efforts. Job evaluation should take into account the design and implementation of performance and reward management systems to ensure that they align with the organisations goals and contribute to a positive work environment

However, is job evaluation enough? Steinburg (1999) stated that very few organisations take into account that job evaluation should also look at emotional labour that may be used by employees.

== Performance appraisal ==
Performance appraisal is the method in which an employee's job performance is evaluated and reviewed. This compares employee work behaviour with the organisations pre-set standards to provide feedback on job performance. Performance appraisals are a form of motivation through either positive or negative reinforcement, depending on outcome. Typically this information is gained through interview and questionnaire functions annually, executed among management of larger organisations primarily, as a method of motivation to gain full potential of staff. The goal of which is to align and manage all organisational resources "to achieve highest possible performance" by improving your current staff through encouragement, setting targets and improving on past mistakes. Edward Lawler of the University of Southern California unveiled research showing that 93% percent of companies use annual appraisal

Performance appraisal was set up in the first place, as a justification for the pay of an employee. If his performance was seen as insufficient, his pay would be cut down. However, if it was seen of a higher quality, he could receive a pay rise. Performance appraisals have been described as a "flawed system", One must ask, can an entire year's work be reviewed at one point in time? It has been argued that the time, money and energy needed is not comparable to its effectiveness. There are various appraisal methods.

Some of these include « rank and yank » by which an organisation ranks its employees against each other and terminates the employment of the employee who finishes at bottom place. That corresponds to the yanking. Then there is the critical incident technique by which the organisation collects information and observes human behaviour that have a strong impact either positive or negative on an activity or procedure.

Each employee is different and can bring in something special to the organisation. Each employee has a specific job to fulfil. Performance appraisals are needed in order to understand how every employee can produce the best performance.

Performance improvement is the notion of measuring the productivity of a certain procedure, and then finding solutions in order for the productivity to rise, the capability of the employees and their effectiveness. In using a performance appraisal, an organisation can build an employee profile of poor performances which allows a reduced risk of legal implications for redundancies. Seeing additional benefit, as the company can decide who is worthy of promotion or bonus'.

== See also ==
- Anger management
- Employee recognition
- Job evaluation
- Justice
- Management
- Organizational behaviour
- Organization development
- Motivation
- Psychology
- Strategic management
- Human relations movement
- Reward system
