= Human resource metrics =

Human resource metrics are measurements used to determine the value and effectiveness of human resources (HR) initiatives, typically including such areas as turnover, training, return on human capital, costs of labor, and expenses per employee.

== Efficiency ==
It is often required of human resources departments to show the organizational value of money and time spent on human resources management training and activities. The value of reporting and analysis of HR performance in various areas aims to improve the organization's function and internal temperature. HR's challenge is to provide business leaders with actionable information that helps them make decisions about investments, marketing strategies, and new products. HR metrics are a vital way to quantify the cost and impact of employee programs and HR processes and measure the success (or failure) of HR initiatives. They enable a company to track year-to-year trends and changes in these critical variables. It is how organizations measure the value of the time and money spent on HR activities in their organization.

The following are some of the examples on efficiency of HR functions:

1. Cost per hire: It is the cost associated with a new hire. It is not only important to know how much it cost in hiring, but it is also important to see if the money spent is used to hire right people. (Boudreau; Lawler & Levenson, 2004)
2. Time to fill: It is the total days to fill up a job opening per each job. The shorter the time, the more efficient of the HR department in finding the replacement for the job
3. HR expense factor: It is the ratio between total company expense and HR expense. It shows if the expenses on HR practices are too much in terms of the whole company expense.

== Effectiveness ==
It shows whether the HR practices have a positive effect on the employees or the applicant pool. This is very important for HR because they are regarded as the leader for acquiring, developing and helping to deploy talent. (Boudreau; Lawler & Levenson, 2004)

The following are some of the examples on effectiveness of the HR functions: (Kavanagh & Thite, 2009)

1. Training ROI: It is the total financial gain an organization have from a particular training. It shows the effectiveness of the training program and how much it can benefit to the company after the training.
2. Absent rate: It determines the company is having an absent problem from the employees. It also reflects the effectiveness of the HR policies as well as the company's own policies. It always goes along with employee satisfaction.
3. Employee retention and Employee turnover

== Developing core competency ==
Metrics help develop core competency by demonstrating the connection between HR practices and the tangible effects on an organization's ability to gain and sustain competitive advantage. This approach often treats employees as human capital instead of expense. (Boudreau; Lawler & Levenson, 2004)

The following are some of the examples on effectiveness of the HR functions:

1. Revenue factor: It indicates the effectiveness of company operation with the use of the employees as their human capital.

2. Defects rate: It indicates the number of defective products in the operation. The lower the defect rate, the more effective the HR practices in developing companies' core competency in terms of reducing cost.

== HR metric & human capital ==
Some HR groups no longer only assess their effectiveness and efficiency and the contribution to the company, but also how those practices can positively affect the human capital (employees) in the organization. "Based on corporate culture, organizational values and strategic business goals and objectives, human capital measures indicate the health of the organization."(Lockwood, 2006)

Key Performance Indicators (KPIs) are used to measure human capital outcomes, such as talent management, employee engagement and high performance, illustrates the firm's business, financial and strategic goals, and promotes partnership with senior management for organizational success. Nowadays, HR people integrated the traditional metrics to KPI which aligned with corporate objectives. The best KPIs should be able to reflect the human capital performance, such as financial outcomes, performance drivers. At the same time, when determining strategic KPIs, it is essential to consider who designs human capital measures and how they are created.

Nancy Lockwood suggests the following 5 assists that can help HR to create a better KPI. It includes involving HR in overall business strategy; Enlisting leaders outside of HR to help develop the KPIs; Collaborating with business managers to ensure KPIs link to business unit strategic goals; Focusing more attention on links between people measures and intermediate performance drivers (e.g., customer satisfaction, engagement etc.); Increasing manager acceptance through training programs and concrete action plans; Working with HR to simplify metric and automate data collection.

== Human resources & metrics ==
Human capital is important to organization because they are the people who are actually working for the organization. They build the company's core competencies and competitive advantages to the organization. With effective management of the human capital, a company can achieve the maximum outputs from its own human capital and be superior to other competitors.

Some organizations are unaware even of how many people they have in their organization. The problem with HR is that they have been held unaccountable in the initiatives and programs they promote across the organization. Typically, nobody in the organization, let alone top business leaders of the organization are aware of the impact of these programs whether, positive or negative. This is because HR leaders have not been delivering metrics that show the value of their programs or investments. HR metrics is important because it allows organizations to make the connection between the value of what HR is doing and the outcomes of the business. If HR professionals don't measure their function's effectiveness and providing decision-making leaders the data they need, HR will continue to be undermined and eventually sidelined when it comes to having a seat at the table. Therefore, many experts urge HR professionals to use the data they have in front of them and understanding how metrics and analysis could give HR an advantage as an overall better strategic partner. This will allow them to help business leaders solve the people problems that matter to the organization.

Before HR metrics, many of the HR activities and processes were difficult to quantify, making it hard to fully understand the real employee costs associated with each HR functions. For example, “a decade ago, if someone looked for turnover rate by performance category, it could be a two-week project.” With HR metrics, more specifically Retention metrics, HR leaders are able to quantify variables such as turnover rate, average tenure, the rate of veteran worker, or the financial impact of employee turnover. These results can indicate how much separating employees is costing the company and help the company to create proactive plans to prevent future loss of top talent.

More importantly, metrics enable leaders and decision makers in organizations towards more efficient and better delivery of HR services

== HR metrics and data ==
Executives tend to make consistently better decisions when they use facts gathered from their organizations in objective ways. Many of the important decisions made by executives affect the business and the bottom line; therefore, in order to convince executive leaders that organizations are benefiting from their people or on the contrary, losing money and wasting resources, HR will need to provide palpable evidence. This evidence can be found in HR Metrics. The key to finding the right metrics for your organization needs is to identify the overall business needs as organizations may differ in terms of the metrics they use. Metrics used by the organization need to show data on how human capital strategy is effective and that organizations are acquiring, developing and deploying the proper talent. Organizations that have trouble deciding what metrics to use for their organizations can always enlist the help of a specialist or consultant to do a company-wide assessment on their organization.

== Software and outsourcing HR metrics ==
For the most part, HR professionals in many companies probably don't need to purchase additional software to create valid metrics. The trick is knowing where to look and how to extract data. If using the correct HR information systems, most information systems should include reporting tools that can provide data on learning and performance management or financial systems. However, organizations have to ensure that the data they have uphold integrity and are quality data.

While HR systems is one way of obtaining metrics, many organizations because of lack of resources or time, or simply because they don't know where to begin can enlist the help of a retention specialist or purchase metric systems designed solely for HR Metrics.

The HRIS systems (Workday, Successfactors, Oracle HR, etc.) provide often strong reporting tools within the systems to reflect cost of people. While talent acquisition systems (like Taleo, etc.) Provide insight in recruitment costs. If the HR department wants to create data around organizational insight, engagement, culture and in general the opinions of the employees, software like FieldRate (business intelligence) or Beekeeper (more focused on communications) can be used, especially if there is a need to reach the employees who do not have a corporate email addresses.
