= Employee-driven growth =

Employee-driven growth (EDG) is a business philosophy that centers an organization's growth on employee support, engagement, and development. It uses employee recognition, engagement, and rewards as strategies for business growth and customer satisfaction.

== Key principles ==
Development

EDG uses feedback loops and incentive structures to improve job performance and satisfaction, which result in enhanced customer experiences. Employee development includes additional classes, certifications, and training that keep employees engaged with their jobs.

Recognition and rewards

EDG emphasizes recognizing and rewarding employees for exceptional service, positive online reviews, and contributions to business success. This recognition often takes the form of financial incentives, but could also include non-cash rewards and other more intrinsic motivators.

== Impact ==
Employee-driven company practices have been shown in studies to increase customer satisfaction by as much as 30 percent. Research has also suggested that the use of recognition and rewards results in increased employee satisfaction, retention, and productivity. Positive employee experience metrics have also been correlated with a 50% increase in revenue growth.

In both franchise businesses and larger corporations, EDG principles such as reward and recognition systems are used to increase hiring and retention rates.
