= Human resources =

Organization's workforce

Human resources (HR) is the set of people who make up the workforce of an organization, business sector, industry, or economy. A narrower concept is human capital, the knowledge and skills which the individuals command.

== Distinction to human resource management ==
In vernacular usage, "human resources" or "human resource" can refer to the human resources department (HR department) of an organization, which performs human resource management, overseeing various aspects of employment, such as compliance with labor law and employment standards, interviewing and selection, performance management, administration of employee benefits, organizing of employee files with the required documents for future reference, and some aspects of recruitment (also known as talent acquisition), talent management, staff wellbeing, and employee offboarding. They serve as the link between an organization's management and its employees.

The duties include planning, recruitment and selection process, posting job ads, evaluating the performance of employees, organizing resumes and job applications, scheduling interviews and assisting in the process and ensuring background checks. Another duty is payroll and benefits administration, which deals with ensuring vacation and sick time are accounted for, reviewing payroll, and participating in benefits tasks, such as claim resolutions, reconciling benefits statements, and approving invoices for payment. Human resources also coordinates employee relations activities and programs, including employee counseling.

Human resource management plays an important part in building a company or organization and contributing to its success. Human resources are intended to show how to have better employment relations in the workforce. Also, to bring out the best work ethic of the employees and therefore making a move to a better working environment. Moreover, green human resource development is suggested as a paradigm shift from traditional approaches of human resource companies to bring awareness of ways that expertise can be applied to green practices. By integrating the expertise, knowledge, and competencies of human resource development practitioners with industry practitioners, most industries have the potential to be transformed into a sector with ecofriendly and pro-environmental culture.

Human resources also deals with essential motivators in the workplace such as payroll, benefits, team morale and workplace harassment.

Administration and operations used to be the two role areas of HR. The strategic planning component came into play as a result of companies recognizing the need to consider HR needs in goals and strategies. HR directors commonly sit on company executive teams because of the HR planning function. Numbers and types of employees and the evolution of compensation systems are among elements in the planning role. Various factors affecting human resource planning include organizational structure, growth, business location, demographic changes, environmental uncertainties, expansion.

The increasing adoption of artificial intelligence has also influenced the role of human resource management in workforce development and organisational learning. Approaches to AI-related workforce transformation emphasise anticipating changes in job tasks and skill requirements rather than relying solely on reactive reskilling. This includes integrating continuous learning, employee participation and the development of human judgement into workforce planning and organisational development.

A human resources manager can have various functions in a company, including to:

- Determine the needs of the staff/personnel
- Human resource accounting, determine whether to use temporary staff or hire employees to fill these needs
- Recruit and/or interview hires
- Prepare employee records and personal policies
- Manage employee payroll, benefits, and compensation
- Manage employee relations, prepare remote work and hybrid work policy
- Employee retention, talent management
- Deal with performance issues, motivate employees, monitor staff well-being
- Mediate disputes, Establish organizational culture in the organization
- Reduce workplace politics, ensure equal opportunities, reduce discrimination
- Ensure that human resources practices conform to various regulations and human resource metrics
- Apply HR software to improve HR effectivity.
- Human resources can be evaluated empirically using various frameworks such as Stamina Model

== History ==
Human resource management used to be referred to as "personnel administration". In the 1920s, personnel administration focused mostly on the aspects of hiring, evaluating, and compensating employees. However, they did not focus on any employment relationships at an organizational performance level or on the systematic relationships in any parties. This led to a lacked unifying paradigm in the field during this period.

According to an HR Magazine article, the first personnel management department started at the National Cash Register Co. in 1900. The owner, John Henry Patterson, organized a personnel department to deal with grievances, discharges and safety, and information for supervisors on new laws and practices after several strikes and employee lockouts. This action was followed by other companies; for example, Ford had high turnover ratios of 380 percent in 1913, but just one year later, the line workers of the company had doubled their daily salaries from $2.50 to $5, even though $2.50 was a fair wage at that time. This example clearly shows the importance of effective management which leads to a greater outcome of employee satisfaction as well as encouraging employees to work together in order to achieve better business objectives.

During the 1970s, American businesses began experiencing challenges due to the substantial increase in competitive pressures. Companies experienced globalization, deregulation, and rapid technological change which caused the major companies to enhance their strategic planning – a process of predicting future changes in a particular environment and focus on ways to promote organizational effectiveness. This resulted in developing more jobs and opportunities for people to show their skills which were directed to effectively applying employees toward the fulfillment of individual, group, and organizational goals. Many years later the major/minor of human resource management was created at universities and colleges also known as business administration. It consists of all the activities that companies used to ensure the more effective use of employees.

Now, human resources focus on the people side of management. There are two real definitions of HRM (Human Resource Management); one is that it is the process of managing people in organizations in a structured and thorough manner. This means that it covers the hiring, firing, pay and perks, and performance management. This first definition is the modern and traditional version more like what a personnel manager would have done back in the 1920s. The second definition is that HRM circles the ideas of management of people in organizations from a macromanagement perspective like customers and competitors in a marketplace. This involves the focus on making the "employment relationship" fulfilling for both management and employees.

Some research showed that employees can perform at a much higher rate of productivity when their supervisors and managers pay more attention to them. The Father of Human Relations, Elton Mayo, was the first person to reinforce the importance of employee communications, cooperation, and involvement. His studies concluded that sometimes human factors are more important than physical factors, such as the quality of lighting and physical workplace conditions. As a result, individuals often place more value on how they feel. For example, a rewarding system in Human Resource Management, applied effectively, can further encourage employees to achieve their best performance.

== Origins of the terminology ==
Pioneering economist John R. Commons mentioned "human resource" in his 1893 book The Distribution of Wealth but did not elaborate. The expression was used during the 1910s to 1930s to promote the idea that human beings are of worth (as in human dignity); by the early 1950s, it meant people as a means to an end (for employers). Among scholars the first use of the phrase in that sense was in a 1958 report by economist E. Wight Bakke.

In regard to how individuals respond to the changes in a labor market, the following must be understood:

- Skills and qualifications: as industries move from manual to more managerial professions so does the need for more highly skilled staff. If the market is "tight" (i.e. not enough staff for the jobs), employers must compete for employees by offering financial rewards, community investment, etc.
- Geographical spread: how far is the job from the individual? The distance to travel to work should be in line with remuneration, and the transportation and infrastructure of the area also influence who applies for a position.
- Occupational structure: the norms and values of the different careers within an organization. Mahoney 1989 developed 3 different types of occupational structure, namely, craft (loyalty to the profession), organization career path (promotion through the firm), and unstructured (lower/unskilled workers who work when needed).
- Generational difference: different age categories of employees have certain characteristics, for example, their behavior and their expectations of the organization.

New terminology, and reinventions of the HR field, include People Operations, employee experience, employee success, people, and partner resources.

== Criticism of terminology ==
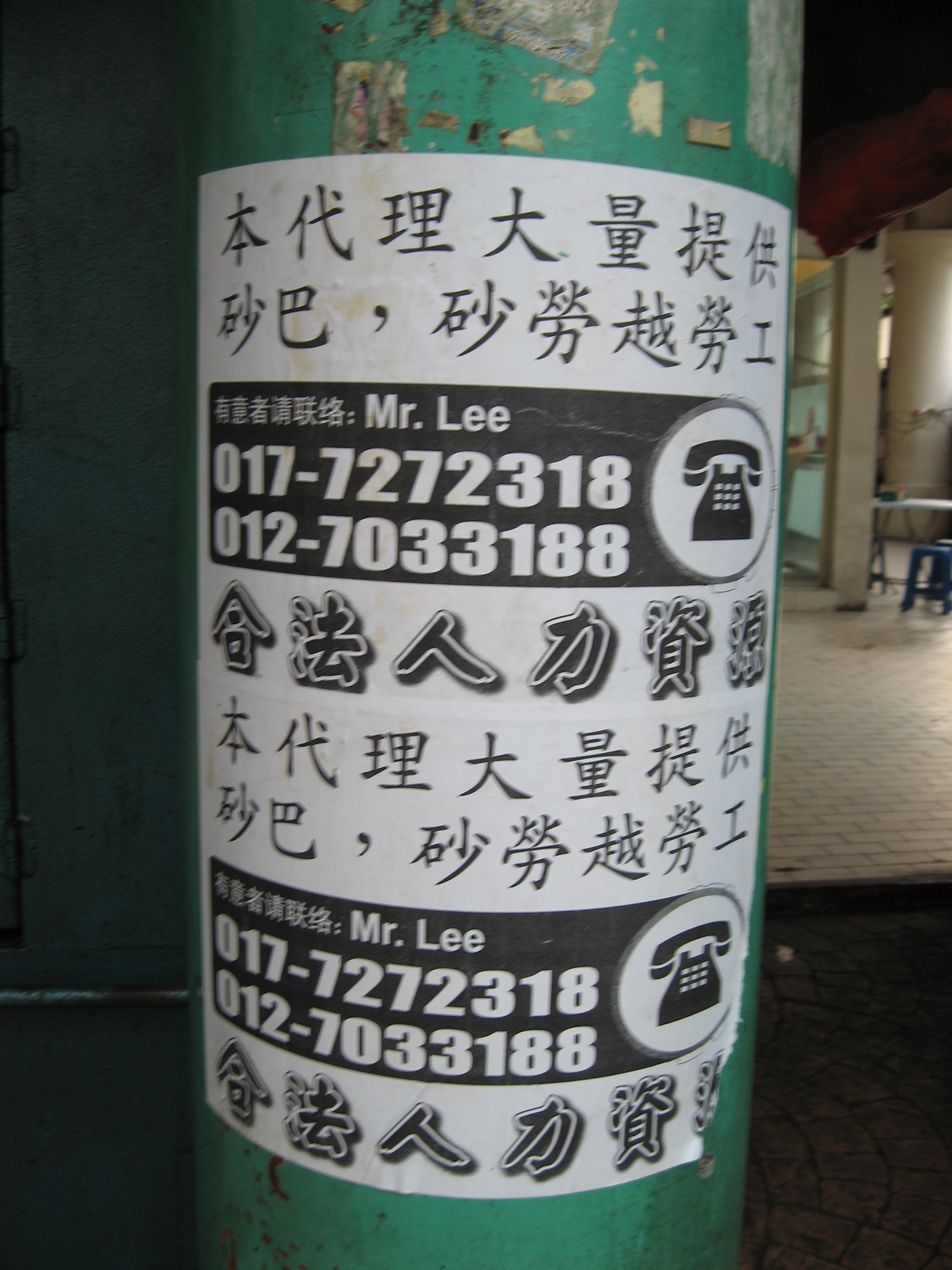
An advertisement for "human resources" (labour) from Sabah and Sarawak, seen in Jalan Petaling, Kuala Lumpur.

One concern about considering people as assets or resources is that they will be commoditized, objectified, and abused. Critics of the term human resources would argue that human beings are not "commodities" or "resources", but are creative and social beings in a productive enterprise. The 2000 revision of ISO 9001, in contrast, requires identifying the processes, their sequence, and interaction, and to define and communicate responsibilities and authorities. In general, heavily unionized nations such as France and Germany have adopted and encouraged such approaches. Also, in 2001, the International Labour Organization decided to revisit and revise its 1975 Recommendation 150 on Human Resources Development, resulting in its "Labour is not a commodity" principle.

Another controversy regards labor mobility and the broader philosophical issue with the usage of the phrase "human resources". Governments of developing nations often regard developed nations that encourage immigration or "guest workers" as appropriating human capital that is more rightfully part of the developing nation and required to further its economic growth. Over time, the United Nations have come to more generally support the developing nations' point of view, and have requested significant offsetting "foreign aid" contributions so that a developing nation losing human capital does not lose the capacity to continue to train new people in trades, professions, and the arts. Some businesses and companies are choosing to rename this department using other terms, such as "people operations" or "culture department," in order to erase this stigma.

== Registered Employer ==
A Registered Employer (EOR) is a third-party organization that officially acts as the employer for employees on behalf of another company. EOR services are often used by companies seeking to hire employees in countries where they do not have local subsidiaries. The EOR enables companies to operate in foreign markets by ensuring that all employment practices comply with local legislation. This arrangement also allows companies to avoid the complexities associated with establishing and maintaining a legal entity in each jurisdiction where they want to hire staff.

Partnering with a company that provides employment contracting services (EOR) frees the HR team from the need to register employees, file tax returns in foreign jurisdictions, or draft contracts from scratch. The EOR takes on HR functions such as payroll calculation, benefits administration, and onboarding of new employees, while ensuring compliance with all local legal requirements. This support reduces the burden on the internal HR department and creates more comfortable conditions for foreign employees. By managing these legal obligations, the EOR reduces the risks companies face when hiring employees abroad.

Employer of Record (EOR) staffing services have become more widespread with the rise of remote work and the expansion of the global workforce. These services allow companies to hire employees in different countries while managing the associated legal and administrative requirements.

According to the Global Employer of Record Study 2024, the EOR market has grown as companies seek to hire employees internationally while complying with various labor regulations.

== See also ==
- People Operations
- Activity-based working
- Chief human resources officer
- Diversity, equity, and inclusion
- Employee offboarding
- Human Resources Development Convention, 1975
- Industrial and organizational psychology
- Merit, excellence, and intelligence (MEI) – framework that emphasizes selecting candidates based solely on their merit, achievements, skills, abilities, intelligence and contributions
