= Employee surveys =

Employee surveys are tools used by organizational leadership to gain feedback on and measure employee engagement, employee morale, and performance. Usually answered anonymously, surveys are also used to gain a holistic picture of employees' feelings on such areas as working conditions, supervisory impact, and motivation that regular channels of communication may not. Surveys are considered effective in this regard provided they are well-designed, effectively administered, have validity, and evoke changes and improvements.

== History ==
The first employee surveys, commonly known as employee-attitude surveys, surfaced in industrial companies in the 1920s. Between 1944 and 1947, the National Industrial Advisory Board saw a 250% jump in companies that chose to conduct an attitude survey (within a 3,500 company group). The increased awareness in measurement tools regarding employees' attitudes is attributed to research and observation conducted during World War II, which sought to measure morale and replicate high-morale environments. The United States Army Research Branch, for example, conducted Soldier Surveys, which recorded the opinions of more than half a million soldiers on topics ranging from food quality to confidence in leadership. Examples of early survey methods include printed questionnaires, directive interviews, and unguided interviews.

== Reasons for use ==
Present day employee surveys are used by an estimated 50 to 75% of companies to evaluate and progress organizational health as it pertains to personnel. This may include a focus on topics such as employee engagement, workplace culture, return on human capital (ROHC), and commitment.

United States federal agencies are required by law to conduct an annual survey. The Office of Personnel Management states that employee influence is a primary reason for conducting surveys, stating, “This is your opportunity to influence change in your agency. Your participation is voluntary and your responses are confidential.”

== Methodology ==
Organizations conduct their own surveys, contract with a survey provider, or use a combination of both. Main-line survey providers have traditionally used similar survey question types and survey length over the course of years and throughout various industries. Comparison databases provide standard ranges on which certain factors can be placed, as well as correlations between coexisting factors (allowing for emphasis on the factor with highest correlation to a desired outcome). In contrast, the advent of survey software, particularly online programs, has given organizational leadership tools to design and conduct their own surveys. In this case, the conducting leadership are responsible for tabulating and assessing the data.

=== Questions ===
A key component of employee surveys is the styling of questions. Variables in question design include:

- number and sequence
- length and wording
- closed or open answer
- factual or attitudinal

Questions that are vague, use technical jargon, are relevant to only a segment of survey-takers, or use phrasing that is interpreted differently across audiences sabotage survey effectiveness. Multiple choice answers, likewise, are a concern when there are missing plausible choices, or when choices are too wordy or too numerous.
