= Remuneration =

Compensation that one receives in exchange for the work or services performed

Remuneration is the pay or other financial compensation provided in exchange for an employee's services performed (not to be confused with giving (away), or donating, or the act of providing to). Remuneration is one component of reward management. In the UK, it can also refer to the automatic division of profits attributable to members in a Limited Liability Partnership (LLP).

== Types ==
Remuneration can include:

- Commission
- Employee benefits
- Employee stock ownership
- Executive compensation
  - Deferred compensation
- Salary
  - Performance-linked incentives
- Wage
- Mandatory compensation payable by an employer to an employee for the benefit obtained from a patent for an invention made by an employee

== United States ==
For wage withholding purposes under U.S. income tax law, the term "wage" means remuneration (with certain exceptions) for services performed by an employee for an employer.

Under the faithless servant doctrine, a doctrine under the laws of a number of states in the United States, and most notably New York State law, an employee who acts unfaithfully towards his or her employer must forfeit all remuneration received during the period of disloyalty.

== See also ==
- Cash
- Fiscal illusion
- Paycheck
- Payroll tax
