= Journal of Personnel Psychology =

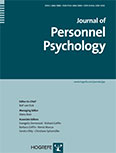
- Discipline: Psychology
- Language: English
- Edited by: Deborah Powell

Publication details
- Former name: Zeitschrift für Personalpsychologie
- History: 2002–present
- Publisher: Hogrefe Publishing (Germany)
- Frequency: Quarterly
- Impact factor: 1.4 (2024)

Standard abbreviations
- ISO 4: J. Pers. Psychol.

Indexing
- Journal of Personnel Psychology
- ISSN: 1866-5888 (print); 2190-5150 (web)
- Zeitschrift für Personalpsychologie
- ISSN: 1617-6391

Links
- Journal homepage

The Journal of Personnel Psychology is a quarterly peer-reviewed academic journal covering personnel psychology. It was established in 2002 and is published by Hogrefe. The editor-in-chief is Deborah Powell (University of Guelph).

== Abstracting and indexing ==
The journal is abstracted and indexed in Current Contents/Social and Behavioral Sciences, Social Sciences Citation Index, PsycINFO, Scopus, and IBZ. According to the Journal Citation Reports, the journal has a 2024 impact factor of 1.4.

== See also ==
- Industrial and organizational psychology
