= Employee turnover =

Act of replacing an employee with a new one

In human resources, turnover refers to the employees who leave an organization. The turnover rate is the percentage of the total workforce that leave over a given period. Organizations and industries typically measure turnover for a fiscal or calendar year.

Employee turnover can occur for a number of reasons, including termination, resignation, retirement, death, and transfers to other sections of the organization. External factors—such as financial pressures, work-family balance, or economic crises—may contribute to both individual decisions regarding turnover, as well as the overall turnover rate of an organization.

High turnover can be particularly harmful to a company's productivity, as skilled workers are often hard to replace. Companies may track turnover internally by department, division, or demographic group. Such comparisons can help reveal whether disproportionate departures are occurring on certain teams or among certain demographic groups, alerting leadership to potential systemic problems that may require correction.

Organizations often survey departing employees to understand the reasons for voluntary turnover, and many find that promptly addressing identified issues significantly reduces departures. Common retention measures include benefits such as paid sick days, paid holidays, and flexible schedules.

== Terminologies ==
Employee attrition, employee turnover, and employee churn all refer to an employee quitting the job, and are often used as synonyms. For the first two terms, the difference is due to the context, i.e., the reasons for the employee leaving. While attrition is usually voluntary or natural, like retirement or resignation, turnover refers to both voluntary and involuntary departures. While turnover includes employees who leave of their own volition, it also refers to employees who are involuntarily terminated or laid off. In the case of turnover, HR's role is to replace employees, while positions vacated through attrition may remain unfilled. Employee churn refers to the total number of attrition and turnover cases combined.

== Types of turnover ==
There are five categories into which turnover can be classified.

- Voluntary vs Involuntary turnover: voluntary turnover occurs when an employee voluntarily chooses to resign from an organization. Voluntary turnover could be the result of a more appealing job offer, staff conflict, or a lack of advancement opportunities, among other causes. Involuntary turnover occurs when the employer makes the decision to discharge an employee and the employee unwillingly leaves their position. Causes of involuntary turnover may include poor performance, staff conflict, or organizational downsizing.
- Functional vs Dysfunctional turnover: functional turnover occurs when a low-performing employee leaves the organization. Functional turnover reduces the amount of paperwork that a company must file in order to rid itself of a low-performing employee. Rather than having to go through the potentially difficult process of proving that an employee is inadequate, the company simply respects their own decision to leave. Dysfunctional turnover occurs when a high-performing employee leaves the organization. Dysfunctional turnover can be potentially costly to an organization, and could be the result of a more appealing job offer or lack of opportunities in career advancement. Too much turnover is not only costly, but it can also give an organization a bad reputation. However, there is also good turnover, which occurs when an organization finds a better fit with a new employee in a certain position. Good turnover can also transpire when an employee has outgrown opportunities within a certain organization and must move forward with their career in a new organization.
- Avoidable vs Unavoidable turnover: avoidable turnover occurs in avoidable circumstances that the organization can change to make employees change their minds and not quit, such as lower pay and rewards or poor working conditions. Unavoidable turnover occurs under unavoidable circumstances, such as a family move, serious illness, or death.
- Internal vs External turnover: internal turnover occurs when employees leave their current position and obtain a new job within the same company. It is related to internal recruitment, in which companies fill vacancies through their employees. External turnover, on the other hand, refers to cases in which the worker and employer separates, whether voluntary or involuntary.
- Skilled vs Unskilled turnover: uneducated and unskilled employees often have a high turnover rate, and they can generally be replaced without the organization or company suffering a loss of performance. The fact that these workers can be easily replaced provides little incentive for employers to offer generous labor contracts; conversely, contracts can greatly benefit the employer and lead to increased turnover as workers seek and eventually find more favorable employment. On the other hand, skilled and educated positions can pose a risk to the company if they leave, thereby leading to replacement costs as well as competitive disadvantages for the company.

== Evolution ==
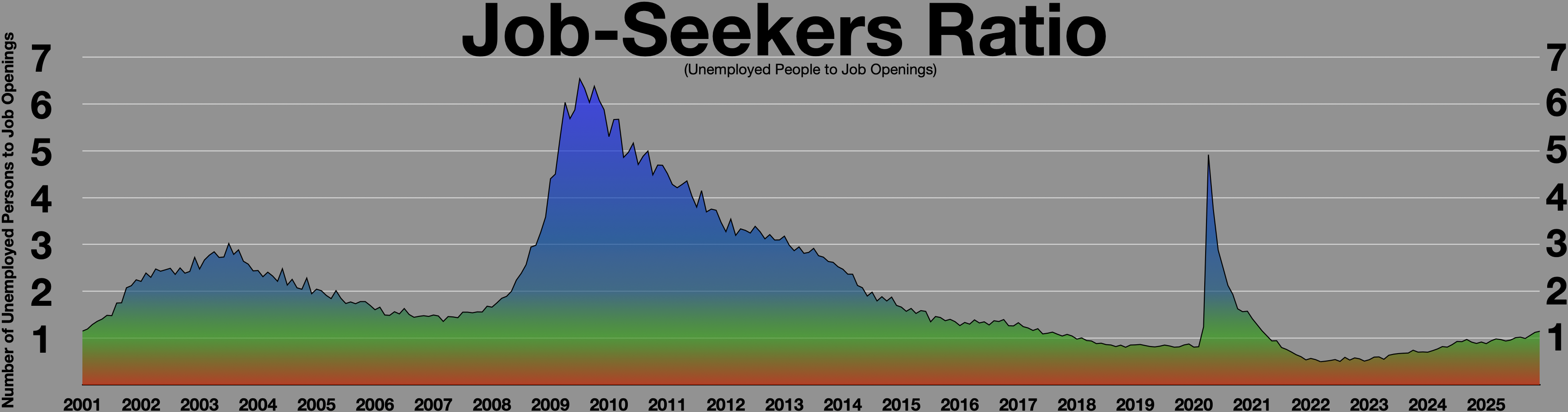
Job seekers ratio Cold job market Balanced job market Hot job market

As the turnover data in the United States show, the turnover rate has been rising for the past 9 years. The only period that is an exception, as expected, is when the first wave occurred due to the Covid-19 pandemic, in which people had no opportunity to change their work. After this period, the phenomenon undergoes a major acceleration in growth (Great Resignation). Possible causes include desire to work for companies with better work policies (i. e. work-life balance, autonomy, smart working), the desire to have a more satisfying job and career advancement opportunities, and safety concerns related to the COVID -19 pandemic.

Attrition trends over the past 9 years
On the x-axis are shown the years, and on the y-axis the annual quits (%).
Source: U.S. Bureau of Labor Statistics

Following the COVID-19 pandemic and the Great Resignation, it has become commonplace for professional employees to voluntarily quit within a year of employment, known as "quick quitting."

== Costs ==
When accounting for the costs (both real costs, such as time taken to select and recruit a replacement, and also opportunity costs, such as lost productivity), some estimates on the cost of employee turnover in for-profit organizations range from 30% to 200% of the employees' salary. There are both direct and indirect costs. Direct costs relate to the leaving costs, replacement costs, and transitions costs. Indirect costs relate to the loss of production, reduced performance levels, defective products, unnecessary overtime, and low morale. In healthcare, staff turnover has been associated with worse patient outcomes. The true cost of turnover may depend on a range of variables including ease or difficulty in filling the position and the nature of the job itself. Estimating the costs of turnover within an organization can be a worthwhile exercise, especially since such costs are unlikely to appear in an organization’s balance sheets: some of the direct costs can be readily calculated, while the indirect costs can often be more difficult to determine and may require "educated guesses" (though not necessarily, e.g., one study traced defective electronics to the staffing levels at the time and location of their production). Nevertheless, calculating even a rough idea of the total expenses relating to turnover can spur action planning within an organization to improve the work environment and reduce turnover. Surveying employees at the time they leave an organization can also be an effective approach to understanding the drivers of turnover within a particular organization.

== Internal versus external ==
Like recruitment, turnover can be classified as "internal" or "external". Internal turnover involves employees leaving their current positions and taking new positions within the same organization. Both positive (such as increased morale from the change of task and supervisor) and negative (such as project/relational disruption, or the Peter Principle) effects of internal turnover exist, and therefore, it may be equally important to monitor this form of turnover as it is to monitor its external counterpart. Internal turnover might be moderated and controlled by typical HR mechanisms, such as an internal recruitment policy or formal succession planning.

Internal turnover, called internal transfers, is generally considered an opportunity to help employees in their career growth while minimizing the more costly external turnover. A large amount of internal transfers leaving a particular department or division may signal problems in that area unless the position is a designated stepping stone position.

== Skilled vs. unskilled employees ==
Unskilled positions often have high turnover, and employees can generally be replaced without the organization or business incurring any loss of performance. The ease of replacing these employees provides little incentive to employers to offer generous employment contracts; conversely, contracts may strongly favour the employer and lead to increased turnover as employees seek, and eventually find, more favorable employment.

== Voluntary versus involuntary ==
Practitioners can differentiate between instances of voluntary turnover, initiated at the choice of the employee, and involuntary turnover initiated by the employer due to poor performance or reduction in force (RIF).

The US Bureau of Labor Statistics uses the term "Quits" to mean voluntary turnover and "Total Separations" for the combination of voluntary and involuntary turnover.

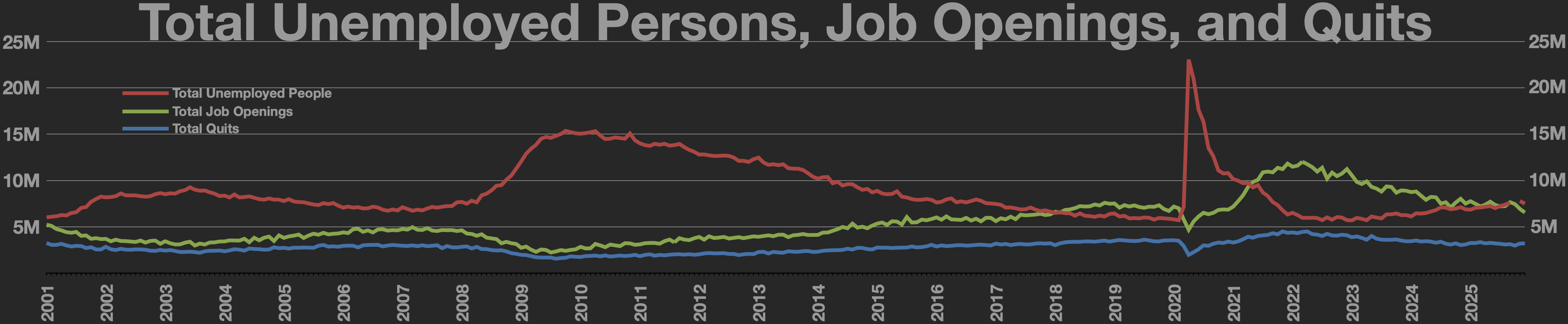
Total unemployed people Total job openings Total quits

== Causes of high or low turnover ==
Turnover can vary significantly based on time and industry. For example, the US 2001 - 2006 annual turnover rate for all industry sectors averaged 39.6% prior to seasonal adjustments, while the leisure and hospitality sector experienced an average annual rate of 74.6% during this same period. The average total of non-farm seasonally adjusted monthly turnover was 3.3% for the period from December 2000 to November 2008.

High turnover often means that employees are dissatisfied with their jobs, especially when it is relatively easy to find a new one. It can also indicate unsafe or unhealthy conditions, or that too few employees give satisfactory performance (due to unrealistic expectations, inappropriate processes or tools, or poor candidate screening). The lack of career opportunities and challenges, dissatisfaction with the job-scope, ability to balance work and personal life, and conflict with the management have been cited as predictors of high turnover.

Each company has its own unique turnover drivers so companies must continually work to identify the issues that cause turnover in their company. Further the causes of attrition vary within a company such that causes for turnover in one department might be very different from the causes of turnover in another department. Research in software engineering contexts shows that both job satisfaction and job embeddedness are negative predictors of turnover intentions. Companies can use exit interviews to find out why employees are leaving and the problems they encountered in the workplace.

Low turnover indicates that none of the above is true: employees are satisfied, healthy and safe, and their performance is satisfactory to the employer. However, the predictors of low turnover may sometimes differ from those of high turnover. Aside from the fore-mentioned career opportunities, salary, corporate culture, management's recognition, and a comfortable workplace seem to impact employees' decision to stay with their employer.

Many psychological and management theories exist regarding the types of job content which is intrinsically satisfying to employees and which, in turn, should minimise external voluntary turnover. Examples include Herzberg's two factor theory, McClelland's theory of needs, and Hackman and Oldham's job characteristics model.

=== Stress ===
Evidence suggests that distress is the major cause of turnover in organizations.

=== Bullying ===
A number of studies report a positive relationship between bullying, intention to leave and high turnover. In some cases, the number people who actually leave is a "tip of the iceberg". Many more who remain have considered leaving. In O’Connell et al.’s (2007) Irish study, 60% of respondents considered leaving whilst 15% actually left the organisation. In a study of public-sector union members, approximately one in five workers reported having considered leaving the workplace as a result of witnessing bullying taking place. Rayner explained these figures by pointing to the presence of a climate of fear in which employees considered reporting to be unsafe, where bullies had "got away with it" previously despite management knowing of the presence of bullying.

One can rather easily spot an office with a bullying problem - there is an exceptionally high rate of turnover. While not all places with high personnel turnover are sites of workplace bullying, nearly every place that has a bully in charge will have elevated staff turnover and absenteeism.

=== Narcissism and psychopathy ===
According to Thomas, there tends to be a higher level of stress with people who work or interact with a narcissist, which in turn increases absenteeism and staff turnover. Boddy finds the same dynamic where there is a corporate psychopath in the organisation.

=== Investments ===
Low turnover may indicate the presence of employee "investments" (also known "side bets") in their position: certain may be enjoyed while the employee remains employed with the organization, which would be lost upon resignation (e.g., health insurance, discounted home loans, redundancy packages). Such employees would be expected to demonstrate lower intent to leave than if such "side bets" were not present.

=== Perceptions of injustice and unfairness ===
Research suggests that organizational justice plays a significant role in an employee’s intention to exit an organization. Perceptions of fairness are antecedents and determinants of turnover intention, especially in how employees are treated, outcomes are distributed fairly, and processes and procedures are consistently followed.

== Consequences ==
=== Negative consequences ===
- Direct costs of turnover: replacement and recruiting costs (advertising, interviewing, testing...), training time and costs), leaving costs – payroll and HR administration, selection and placement costs, orientation costs, lost wages/salaries, administrative costs, loss of human capital, and customer satisfaction problems, time of the newer employee to be easy with the new system, with the co-employee, to be familiar with the new environment etc, vacancy problems, loss of productivity and performance), cost of inefficiency of the new staff.
- Indirect costs of turnover: operational disruption, demoralization of employees (who remain), increased work-load, negative image on the organization, employee development plans fail, unfulfilled daily functions, hidden costs (instead of an organization expending substantial amount of money and time trying to find replacements for disengaged employees, it could have dedicated such resources and energy in productive activities that will contribute towards moving the organization in achieving its objectives), relationships with co-workers negatively affected; interpretation of the departures of a former colleague as a rejection of the job (begin to realize the possibility that better job opportunities exist), loss of confidence (in the project), unexpected leaves and remaining co-workers have to compensate by, customer service; management frustration, distractions, loss of experiences and skilled personnel/loss of knowledge, loss of output (from those leaving before they are replaced, because of delays in obtaining replacements, while new starters are on their learning curve).

=== Positive consequences ===
- Enhance individual and organizational work performance: better job skills and more motivation/productivity of the new employee.
- Reduction of entrenched conflict: resolve conflicts (when a conflicting supervisor or co-worker leaves an organization).
- Increasing mobility and morale: the turnover may open positions in an otherwise impenetrable hierarchy, being a creator of promotion opportunities); "resolve deep-seated conflicts" between the conflicting parties and contributes to organizational morale, termination of bad matches, creating opportunities for advancement.
- Positive attitudes: job satisfaction, organizational commitment.
- Social capital gain: the newly arrived employee increases his or her social capital and experiences socialization through the new employment.
- Setting the culture right (innovation and adaptation): import new type of knowledge, ideas, experience and skills introduction of change.
- Cost savings: leave of relatively expensive employees, coping mechanism for individuals under stress and invite absenteeism, carelessness, sabotage, and other non-productive behaviours.

== Prevention ==
Employees are important in running of a business; without them the business would be unsuccessful. However, more and more employers today are finding that employees remain for approximately 23 to 24 months, according to the 2006 Bureau of Labor Statistics. The Employment Policy Foundation states that losing an employee costs a company an average of $15,000. This figure includes separation costs, such as covering unemployment for the departing employee; vacancy costs, such as paying existing employees overtime or hiring temporary employees to cover the departed employee's work; and replacement costs, including advertising the vacancy, interviewing candidates, and covering relocation and training for the new hire. It also factors in the decrease in productivity among the former employee's colleagues.

Providing a stimulating workplace environment, which fosters happy, motivated and empowered individuals, lowers employee turnover and absentee rates. Promoting a work environment that fosters personal and professional growth promotes harmony and encouragement on all levels, so the effects are felt company wide.

Continual training and reinforcement develops a work force that is competent, consistent, competitive, effective and efficient. Beginning on the first day of work, providing the individual with the necessary skills to perform their job is important. Before the first day, it is important the interview and hiring process expose new hires to an explanation of the company, so individuals know whether the job is their best choice. Networking and strategizing within the company provides ongoing performance management and helps build relationships among co-workers. It is also important to motivate employees to focus on customer success, profitable growth and the company well-being. Employers can keep their employees informed and involved by including them in future plans, new purchases, policy changes, as well as introducing new employees to the employees who have gone above and beyond in meetings. Early engagement and engagement along the way, shows employees they are valuable through information or recognition rewards, making them feel included.

When companies hire the best people, new talent hired and veterans are enabled to reach company goals, maximizing the investment of each employee. Taking the time to listen to employees and making them feel involved will create loyalty, in turn reducing turnover allowing for growth.

== Calculation ==
Labour turnover is equal to the number of employees leaving, divided by the average total number of employees (in order to give a percentage value). The number of employees leaving and the total number of employees are measured over one calendar year.

$$\mbox{Labour Turnover} = \frac{\mbox{NELDY}}{\mbox{(NEBY + NEEY)/2}}$$

Where:

- NELDY = Number of Employees who Left During the Year
- NEBY = Number of Employees at the Beginning of the Year
- NEEY = Number of Employees at the End of the Year

For example, at the start of the year a business had 40 employees, but during the year 9 staff resigned with 2 new hires, thus leaving 33 staff members at the end of the year. Hence this year's turnover is 25%. This is derived from, (9/((40+33)/2)) = 25%. However the above formula should be applied with caution if data is grouped. For example, if the attrition rate is calculated for employees with a tenure of 1 to 4 years, this formula may result in an artificially inflated attrition rate, as employees with a tenure of more than 4 years would not be counted in the denominator.

More precise calculations of turnover have also been developed. For example, instead of averaging the headcounts from the beginning of the year and the end of the year, the denominator of the labour turnover formula can be calculated by averaging the headcount from each day of the year. An even better approach is to avoid the several issues inherent to traditional labour turnover rates by employing more advanced and accurate methods (e.g., event history analysis, realized turnover rates).

== Models ==
Over the years there have been thousands of research articles exploring the various aspects of turnover, and in due course several models of employee turnover have been promulgated. The first model, and by far the one attaining most attention from researchers, was put forward in 1958 by March & Simon. After this model there have been several efforts to extend the concept. Since 1958 the following models of employee turnover have been published.

- March and Simon (1958) Process Model of Turnover
- Porter & Steers (1973) Met Expectations Model
- Price (1977) Causal Model of Turnover
- Mobley (1977) Intermediate Linkages Model
- Hom and Griffeth (1991) Alternative Linkages Model of Turnover
- Whitmore (1979) Inverse Gaussian Model for Labour Turnover
- Steers and Mowday (1981) Turnover Model
- Sheridan & Abelson (1983) Cusp Catastrophe Model of Employee Turnover
- Jackofsky (1984) Integrated Process Model
- Lee et al. (1991) Unfolding Model of Voluntary Employee Turnover
- Aquino et al. (1997) Referent Cognitions Model
- Mitchell & Lee (2001) Job Embeddedness Model
- Laulié & Morgeson (2021) Turnover Events Theory.

== See also ==
- Adaptive performance
- Employee retention
- Human resource metrics
- Job satisfaction
- Realistic job preview
