= Employee retention =

Ability of an organization to keep its employees

Employee retention is the ability of an organization to retain its employees and ensure sustainability. Employee retention can be represented by a simple statistic (for example, a retention rate of 80% usually indicates that an organization kept 80% of its employees in a given period). Employee retention is also the strategies employers use to try to retain the employees in their workforce.

In a business setting, the goal of employers is usually to decrease employee turnover, thereby decreasing training costs, recruitment costs and loss of talent and of organisational knowledge. Some employers seek "positive turnover" whereby they aim to maintain only those employees whom they consider to be high performers.

== Cost of turnover ==
Studies have shown that cost related to directly replacing an employee can be as high as 50–60% of the employee's annual salary, but the total cost of turnover can reach as high as 90–200% of the employee's annual salary. These costs include candidate views, new hire training, the internal recruiter's salary, the costs to retain a 3rd party recruiter, separation processing, job errors, lost sales, reduced morale and a number of other costs to the organization. Turnover also affects organizational performance. High-turnover industries such as retailing, food services, call centres, elder-care nurses, and salespeople make up almost a quarter of the United States population. Replacing workers in these industries is less expensive than in other, more stable, employment fields but costs can still reach over $500 per employee. As of November 2022, Gallup found that 49% of U.S. employees were watching for or actively seeking a new job. In the United States, the Bureau of Labor Statistics recorded 38.0 million voluntary quits in 2025, down by 1.3 million from 2024. Quits accounted for 60.6 percent of total separations in 2025, and the annual average quits rate was 2.0 percent.

== Theory ==
An alternative motivation theory to Maslow's hierarchy of needs is the motivator-hygiene (Herzberg's) theory. While Maslow's hierarchy implies the addition or removal of the same need stimuli will enhance or detract from the employee's satisfaction, Herzberg's findings indicate that factors garnering job satisfaction are separate from factors leading to poor job satisfaction and employee turnover. Herzberg's system of needs is segmented into motivators and hygiene factors. Hygiene factors include expected conditions that if missing will create dissatisfaction. Examples of hygiene factors include bathrooms, lighting, and the appropriate tools for a given job. Employers must utilize positive reinforcement methods while maintaining expected hygiene factors to maximize employee satisfaction and retention.

== Flexible work arrangements ==
Flexible work arrangements (FWAs) involve adapting an organization's work system to become more flexible, which may include adjusting how tasks are distributed among employees or allowing staff to set their own working hours and location. Although FWAs existed before the COVID-19 pandemic, the use of FWAs surged during the pandemic. According to a 2023 OECD report, almost all public sector organizations in OECD countries implemented flexible working arrangements, at least in the form of part-time work and flextime.

FWAs were found to have a positive impact on employee retention and also organizational productivity in a 2022 study.

FWAs increase flexibility in when, where, and sometimes how employees work. As a result, employees with higher autonomy tend to value their jobs more, experience greater happiness and job satisfaction, and are more likely to stay with their employer. Employees who work under FWAs report greater work-life balance satisfaction, which reduces turnover.

FWAs can sometimes negatively impact employee retention. Issues such as stress and work-life conflict from unclear working hours, isolation due to a lack of physical interaction in remote work, health problems caused by compressed workweeks, or reduced engagement and productivity due to inadequate work tools can all arise.

A large-scale field experiment by Bloom, Han, and Liang (2024) found that employees offered a hybrid schedule—three days in the office and two days at home—were 35 percent less likely to quit over a two-year period than those required to work on-site full-time.

In September 2024 the New Zealand Government issued updated guidance for public service agencies stating that working from home "is not an entitlement" and must be mutually agreed between employer and employee. The guidance requires that remote arrangements "must not compromise employee performance or the objectives of the agency," and directs agencies to monitor and report the number and type of agreements to the Public Service Commission, which will publish the data for transparency.

Equity considerations further complicate retention outcomes. Hybrid policies can inadvertently favor employees with suitable home office environments and high-speed internet, while disadvantaging those in small or shared living spaces. Research also shows gendered effects: hybrid work can help retain women with caregiving responsibilities, yet some women report slower advancement when working remotely more frequently than male colleagues.

To maximize the retention advantages of remote and hybrid models, a report from McKinsey recommend clear performance metrics, regular virtual check-ins, and intentional efforts to maintain organizational culture.

== Technological advancements in retention strategies ==
Artificial Intelligence (AI) tools have been used to analyze employee performance metrics to attempt to identify patterns that may indicate potential turnover.

HR analytics has been used to identify the root causes of employee attrition.

== Diversity and inclusion ==
Diversity, equity, and inclusion (DEI) initiatives are designed to promote equity, combat discrimination, and provide support for diverse employee needs. Research conducted by Ashikali and Groeneveld in 2015 established that the positive effect of diversity management on employee commitment is often mediated by the inclusiveness of the organizational culture and the role of transformational leadership. Supervisors who promote inclusion are required for these initiatives to be successful. Trochmann, Stewart, and Ragusa (2023) found that positive perceptions of diversity and inclusion were significantly associated with higher levels of job satisfaction and overall workplace happiness in racially diverse agencies. Brimhall, Lizano, and Barak (2014) emphasized that a positive diversity climate reduces employees' intention to leave by fostering a sense of inclusion and job satisfaction.

Ritz and Alfes (2018) showed that in multilingual public administrations, employees' attachment to their jobs increased when their supervisors actively supported diversity and fostered an inclusive environment. Choi and Rainey (2014) highlighted the importance of leadership in promoting perceived organizational fairness.
