= Executive Counsel Limited =

- Company type: Privately held company
- Industry: Public affairs industry
- Founded: 2003; 23 years ago
- Headquarters: Hong Kong
- Area served: Asia
- Key people: Timothy J. Peirson-Smith (Managing Director)
- Products: Strategy, lobbying, stakeholder engagement, government relations, political intelligence, sustainability support, research, internal communications, brand building, media relations, event promotion, media monitoring, copywriting, speechwriting, editing
- Number of employees: 8 (2019)
- Website: www.execounsel.com

Executive Counsel is a Hong Kong business strategy and communications consultancy firm headquartered in Hong Kong. The company advises on public affairs, government relations, lobbying, stakeholder engagement, public relations, sustainability, brand building and corporate communications with a focus on the Asia region.

== History ==
Executive Counsel Limited was founded in 2003 by communications strategist Timothy J. Peirson-Smith, current Chairman of the Business Policy Unit of the British Chamber of Commerce in Hong Kong.

Prior to 2003, Peirson-Smith was involved in the communications and environmental aspects of many major development projects.

Executive Counsel's blue bowler hat logo is inspired by Edward de Bono's Six Thinking Hats and works by Belgian surrealist René Magritte, particularly The Man in the Bowler Hat and The Son of Man (both 1964).

== Focus and Issues ==
The company has clients from a broad range of sectors, including tourism, accountancy, banking and finance, investment promotion, recruitment, transportation, logistics, IT, environment, healthcare, property, energy and the public sector.

In Hong Kong, Executive Counsel has become known for infrastructure, construction and development, with Managing Director Timothy J. Peirson-Smith a regular commentator on these sectors in local media and the conference circuit.

Executive Counsel is also active in public relations, media campaigns and event planning. Executive Counsel Limited has also provided PR support to the Vienna Representative Office in Hong Kong.

== Offices ==
- Hong Kong founded in 2003
- Macau founded in 2007
