= Work engagement =

Work engagement is the "harnessing of organization member's selves to their work roles: in engagement, people employ and express themselves physically, cognitively, emotionally and mentally during role performances". Three aspects of work motivation are cognitive, emotional and physical engagement.

There are two schools of thought with regard to the definition of work engagement. On the one hand Maslach and Leiter assume that a continuum exists with burnout and engagement as two opposite poles. The second school of thought operationalizes engagement in its own right as the positive antithesis of burnout. According to this approach, work engagement is defined as a positive, fulfilling, work-related state of mind that is characterized by vigor, dedication, and absorption. Vigor is characterized by high levels of energy and mental resilience while working, the willingness to invest effort in one's work, and persistence even in the face of difficulties; dedication by being strongly involved in one's work, and experiencing a sense of significance, enthusiasm, inspiration, pride, and challenge; and absorption by being fully concentrated and happily engrossed in one's work, whereby time passes quickly and one has difficulties with detaching oneself from work.

Organizations need energetic and dedicated employees: people who are engaged with their work. These organizations expect proactivity, initiative and responsibility for personal development from their employees.

== As a unique concept ==
Work engagement as measured by the UWES is positively related with, but can nevertheless be differentiated from, similar constructs such as job involvement and organizational commitment, in-role and extra-role behavior; personal initiative, Type A, and workaholism. Moreover, engaged workers are characterized by low levels of burnout, as well as by low levels of neuroticism and high levels of extraversion. Also they enjoy good mental and physical health.

== Trait versus state ==
Generally, work engagement is conceptualized as a relatively stable phenomenon. This can be explained by the presence of specific job and organizational characteristics. However, engagement is not a fixed state: the level of engagement can even fluctuate on a weekly or day-to-day basis. Increasingly, attention is being paid to these short-term fluctuations by conducting experience sampling studies and diary studies. Christian, Garza, and Slaughter (2011) meta-analyzed over 90 engagement research studies. They found that engagement is distinct from job satisfaction, organizational commitment, and job involvement.

== Measurement ==
The three aspects of work engagement (vigor, dedication and absorption) are assessed by the Utrecht Work Engagement Scale (UWES), which is currently available in 20 languages and can be used freely for non-commercial purposes. In addition a short form and a student version are available. The reliability and validity of the UWES is documented is various studies.

The Oldenburg Burnout Inventory (OLBI) is an alternative instrument for the assessment of work engagement. It consists of two dimensions: exhaustion-vigor and cynicism-dedication.

The recently operationalized construct of drive was proposed as the key differentiating individual difference dimension of work engagement and has shown promising psychometric results. Measured on the basis of 13 facets and three aspects (passion, effort, ideation), drive is argued to predict future motivation and engagement levels better than measuring these attributes directly at any point in time, in any given context.

== Main drivers ==
Research has identified two key sets of variables that drive work engagement:

- Job resources: Work engagement is found to be positively associated with job resources such as social support from co-workers and from one's superior, performance feedback, coaching, job control, task variety, opportunities for learning and development, and training facilities. These resources are helpful in reducing the impact of job demands on strain, but they are also useful in the achievement of work goals, and they stimulate learning, personal growth and development. One consistent finding is that the motivational potential of job resources is particularly salient in the face of high job demands.

Example: In a longitudinal study among 2555 Finnish dentists, researchers found that job resources lead to work engagement, which in turn had an influence on the level of personal initiative and consequently on work-unit innovativeness.
Example: In a study that aimed to examine job resources, work engagement and Finnish dairy farmers’ preferences concerning methods to enhance overall well-being while working on farms. The results indicate that the family, working with cattle, healthy farm animals, a reasonable workload, and a sustainable farm economy have the capacity to create positive impacts on well-being among dairy farmers. Well-being on farms is a part of sustainable food production.

- Personal resources: personal resources, such as optimism, self-efficacy and resilience are functional in controlling the environment and exerting impact on it in a successful way. Furthermore, engaged employees have several personal characteristics that differentiate them from less engaged employees. Five factor model is useful for examining the dispositional source of work engagement. As a higher order factor work engagement was related to big five factors. Examples are extraversion, conscientiousness and emotional stability. Psychological capital also seems to be related to work engagement.

Example: Xanthopoulou, Bakker, Demerouti, and Schaufeli (2007) studied Dutch technicians' work engagement in relation to three personal resources (self-efficacy, organizational-based self-esteem, and optimism). Results indicated that these resources were related to work engagement.

For an overall model of work engagement, see Bakker & Demerouti (2008).

The work motivation model includes 5 elements of individual motivators: money, myself, membership of a team, mastery, and mission. The approach is similar to Maslow's hierarchy of needs.

== Performance ==
Engagement is related to better performance. For instance, engaged contact workers from hotels and restaurants produce better service quality as perceived by their customers; the more engaged university students feel the higher their next year's Grade Point Average; the higher the level of engagement of flight attendants, the better their in- and extra-role performance on the flight; and the more engaged restaurant workers, the higher the financial turnover of the shift. Other research has shown links between supervisor-ratings of performance and the work engagement of teachers and administrative workers in financial services. Salanova, Agut and Peiró (2005) found a positive relationship between organization resources, work engagement and performance among employees, working in Spanish restaurants and hotels.

There are several possible reasons why engaged employees show higher performance than non-engaged employees:

- They often experience positive emotions;
- They experience better health;
- They create their own job and personal resources;
- They transfer their engagement to others (cross-over).

== Downside ==
There is also a possibility of becoming 'over-engaged'. For example, it can distort the work-life balance when employees take work home. Over-engagement may also lead to workaholism.

== See also ==
- Adaptive performance
- Employee engagement
- Happiness at work
- Motivation
- Positive psychology in the workplace
- Work motivation
