= Positive psychology in the workplace =

Positive psychology is defined as a method of building on what is good and what is already working instead of attempting to stimulate improvement by focusing on the weak links in an individual, a group, or in this case, a company. Implementing positive psychology in the workplace means creating an environment that is more enjoyable, productive, and values individual employees. This also means creating a work schedule that does not lead to emotional and physical distress.

== Overview ==
Positive psychology in the workplace focuses on shifting attention away from negative aspects such as workplace violence, stress, burnout, and job insecurity; it shifts attention to positive and hopeful attributes, resilience, confidence, and a productive work culture that emphasizes professional success and human success. Through the employment of positive psychology, a working environment to promote positive affect in its employees can be created.

Fun should not be looked at as something that cannot be achieved during work but rather as a motivation factor for the staff. However, the type of fun in the workplace needs to be considered by the manager. Depending on the learning types of their employees, it is not always productive depending on the personalities of their employees. Along this line, it is important to examine the role of helping behaviors, team-building exercises, job resources, job security, and work support.

The emerging field of positive psychology also helps to creatively manage organizational behaviors and to increase productivity in the workplace through applying positive organizational forces. Recent research on job satisfaction and employee retention have created a great need to focus on implementing positive psychology in the workplace.

== Background ==
According to the United States Department of Labor, "In 2009, employed persons worked an average of 7.5 hours on the days they worked, which were mostly weekdays. [In addition to that], 84 percent of employed persons did some or all of their work at their workplace." This indicates that majority of the population spend their waking hours at work, outside their homes. Therefore, employers must do their best to create a low stress and inspiring work environment to yield greater productivity.

Michelle T. Iaffaldano and Paul M. Muchinsky were among the first people to ignite interest in the connection between job satisfaction and job performance. The meta-analytic research of these individuals impacted the way in which later research on the topic was conducted, especially regarding sample sizes.

== Major theoretical approaches ==
Martin E.P. Seligman and Mihaly Csikszentmihalyi are noted frontrunners in the area of positive psychology as a field of study. They state that "psychology has become a science largely about healing. Therefore its concentration on healing largely neglects the fulfilled individual and thriving community". Seligman and Csikszentmihalyi further stress that, "the aim of positive psychology is to begin to catalyze a change in the focus of psychology from preoccupation only with repairing the worst things in life to also building positive qualities."

Abraham Maslow and Carl Rogers developed Humanistic Psychology that focuses on the positive potential of people and on helping people reach their full potential.

Peter Warr is noted for his early work on work well being. "Proponents of the well-being perspective argue that the presence of positive emotional states and positive appraisals of the worker and his or her relationships within the workplace accentuate worker performance and quality of life". A common idea in work environment theories is that demands match or slightly exceed the resources. With regards to research concerning positive outcomes within the employment setting, several models have been established like Demand Control, Job Demands-Resources, and Job Characteristics.

=== Demand control model ===
Robert A. Karasek is credited with this particular work design model. In Karasek's model, workplace stress is in indicator of how taxing a worker's job is and how much control, authority, discretion, and decision latitude the worker has over his/her tasks and duties. This creates four kinds of jobs—passive, active, low strain and high strain The Demand Control Model (DCM) has been used by researchers to design jobs that enhance the psychological and physical well-being. This model promotes a work design that proposes high demand and high control, fostering an environment that encourages learning and simultaneously offers autonomy.

This model is based on the assumption that "workers with active jobs are more likely to seek challenging situations that promote mastery, thereby encouraging skill and knowledge acquisition". It also points out the role of social support, referring to the quality interactions between colleagues and managers. However, there is some controversy over this model because some researchers believe it lacks evidence for the interaction between demand and control.

The DCM, (otherwise known as the Diagnosing and Statistical Manuel for Diagnosing Mental Disorders), is commonly criticized for its inability to consistently replicate findings to support its basic assumption. Some feel that the DCM is somewhat unhelpful in that it may prompt people who do not need a diagnosis to be diagnosed anyway; thus making it a potential H.R problem. However, there is evidence supporting the idea that "high amounts of job control is associated with increases in job satisfaction and decreased depression, however, high demands with out adequate control may lead to increase anxiety".

=== Job demands resources ===
The job demands-resources model (JD-R) is an expansion of the DCM and is founded on the same principle that high job demands and high job resources produce employees with more positive work attitudes. The difference between the JD-R and DCM is that the JD-R expounds upon the differentiation between demand and resources, as well as encompasses a broader view of resources. This model refers to demands as " those physical, psychological, social, or organizational aspects of the job that require sustained physical and/or psychological effort. This may refer to jobs that require contact with customers. Resources are regarded as "those physical, psychological, social, or organizational aspects of the job that are either/or: (1) functional in achieving work goals; (2) reduce job demands and the associated physiological and psychological costs; and (3) stimulate personal growth, learning, and development". Another difference between these two theories is that the JD-R postulates that resources can be predictors of motivation and learning related outcomes. The findings by Bakker and colleagues supports their hypothesis that many resources may be linked to job well-being. They also found that "task enjoyment and organizational commitment are the result of combinations of many different job demands and job resources. Enjoyment and commitment were high when employees were confronted with challenging and stimulating tasks, and simultaneously had sufficient resources at their disposal".

=== Job characteristics model ===
The job characteristics model (JCM) is "an influential theory of work design developed by Hackman and Oldham. It is based upon five characteristics - skill variety, task identity, task significance, task autonomy, and task feedback - which are used to identify the general content and structure of jobs". This model argues that employees with a personal need for growth and development, as well as knowledge and skill, will display more positive work outcomes. These include things such as: job satisfaction, lower absenteeism, and better work turnover. This model is based upon an idea that high task control and feedback are two essential elements for maximizing work potential. Stronger experiences of these five traits is said to lead to greater job satisfaction and better performance.

== Empirical evidence ==
=== Safety ===
In order to protect the physical and mental health of workers, the demands of the job must be balanced by easily accessible job resources in order to prevent burnout in employees yet encourage employee engagement. Engagement signifies a positive employee who is committed to the safety within the workplace for self and others. In contrast, burnout represents a negative employee possessing elements of anxiety, depression, and work-related stress. Engagement increases as job resources like knowledge of safety are present. On the other hand, burnout increases when more job demands are present without the buffering effects of job resources.

Hazards in the workplace can be seen as a combination of the physical demands of the work and the complexity of the work. Job resources provide a buffering effect that protects the employees from job demands like high work pressure, an unfavorable physical environment, and emotionally demanding interactions. Employees are better equipped to handle changes in their work environment when resources are readily available. The resources a job can provide include autonomy, support, and knowledge of safety. Autonomy allows employees the freedom to decide how to execute their work. Support can originate directly from a supervisor or from other workers in the environment. And lastly, employees must have knowledge about safety procedures and policies. When the employee is able to work in a safe environment, workers are more satisfied with their jobs. A safe environment provides support and resources that promote healthy employees.

=== Emotion, attitude and mood ===
Emotional intelligence is the ability to recognize and interpret emotions that can be used to regulate emotions and assist cognitive processes which promote emotional and intellectual growth. Emotional intelligence has been researched by Carmelli (2003) in order to see its effect on employees work performance. Due to the social nature of the interactions of the employees, emotional intelligence is essential in order to work well with co-workers. When employees work well together by coordinating their efforts, their task performance improves and as a result the business benefits. With emotional intelligence, employees are better able to perceive others needing help and are more willing to help for intrinsic benefits.

Isen & Reeve (2005) proposed that positive affect led to positive intrinsic motivation for completing a task. As a result of the intrinsic motivation, the employees enjoyed the task more and were more optimistic when having to complete a more uninteresting task. The combination of having the freedom to choose tasks and maintaining positive affect results in better task performance. Positive affect promotes self-control to remain focused on any task and forward-looking thinking that motivates workers to look-forward to more enjoyable tasks.

Concepts of positive psychology like hope and altruism provide a positive work environment that influences the moods and attitudes of workers. Youssef & Luthans (2007) examined the effects hope, optimism, and resilience had in the workplace on employees' job performance, job satisfaction, work happiness, and organizational commitment. Hope and resilience had a more direct effect on organizational commitment whereas hope had a greater impact on performance. Hope allows employees to be better at creating more realistic plans for completing task so as not to focus on the failure that accompanies an incomplete task. Optimism strengthens the employee's resilience to break through barriers and causes the employee to build social support and other strengths to overcome any obstacle he or she may encounter.

Positive psychology also encourages maintaining a positive mood in the work environment to encourage productivity on an individual level and organizational level. Organizational citizenship behaviors (OCB) refer to behaviors like altruism and compliance that are not formal tasks in that the behaviors are not a mandatory of the workers job description. They are considered extra-role behaviors that help in gauging the workers commitment to the job and to the rules of the job in the absence of monitoring these behaviors. OCB have proven to improve the moods of employees and the moods in the workplace. A helping behavior improves mood because the individual is no longer focused on negative moods; helping others acts as a distracter for the employee. Altruism is effective because it has more impact in a social setting like the workplace and is more extrinsically rewarding. OCB encourage positive interactions among workers, and they lead to better psychological health for employees.

According to Froman (2010), having a more hopeful perspective about life leads one to being more optimistic about responding to opportunities. Workers are more resilient to adversity and are able to bounce back more quickly. When organizations encourage positive attitudes in their employees, they grow and flourish. As a result, the organization profits and grows from the human capital of productive employees and the monetary capital resulting from productive workers.

=== Fun ===
Chan (2010) studied fun activities in the workplace that created a positive work environment that could retain and attract employees and encourage employee well-being. Activities must be enjoyable, encourage responsibility, and help employees become team players. These qualities empower employees to become more engaged with their work, take on more leadership roles, and experience less stress. Making the workplace fun promotes positive, happy moods in employees that in turn increase job satisfaction and organizational commitment. According to Chan's framework, workplace fun must be staff-oriented, supervisor-oriented, social-oriented, or strategy-oriented. While staff-oriented activities focus on creating fun work for employees, supervisor-oriented activities create a better relationship between the employees and supervisors. Social-oriented activities create social events that are organizational-based (i.e. company barbecue or Christmas office party). Strategy-oriented activities allow more autonomy with employees in different aspects of their work in hopes of cultivating strengths within the organization's employees. The framework proposes that a fun work environment promotes employee well-being in addition to fostering creativity, enthusiasm, satisfaction, and communication among the organization's employees. The research found in this study hopes to encourage implementing other work fun activities in other various industries in order to engage and retain positive employees.

There have also been connections between workplace fun and creativity in the workplace. Studies have found that a fun workplace environment is an antecedent to employee creativity. Fun in the workplace has also been shown to be positively correlated with the creative performance of employees.

=== Flow ===
Flow is when a person is in an intensely focused state. Flow is achieved when there is a proper balance between the person's skill level and the challenge of the task they are engaging in. Researchers are also starting to look into the connection between flow in the workplace and positive affect in the workplace. Tobert and Moneta found a significant negative correlation between flow and negative affect. They also found a significant positive correlation between flow and positive correlation. As there is more positive affect in the workplace, more flow will be able to occur. In turn, the more flow there is, the more positive affect there will be. A similar spiral happens with negative affect. The more negative affect there is in a workplace, the likelihood of flow will decrease. As the flow decreases, it can lead to more negative affect in the workplace.

Other researchers have looked into the connection between employee motivation and flow. In order to create this optimal level of flow, there needs to be a balance between challenge, skill, workload, and the capacity to work. When all of these are balanced, employees are more highly motivated and more effective in their duties.

=== Creativity ===
Creativity also has a critical role in the workplace. Creativity leads organizations to be able to overcome problems, innovate, and ultimately have success. Workplace creativity is defined as new, useful, and valuable services, ideas, processes, or products that were created by individuals in the workplace. Creativity in the workplace has been linked to increased positive affect in employees. Tavares found that creative workplaces led to employees feeling that their work was meaningful. As work became meaningful to them, they felt more satisfied and that they had a purpose in life.

== Application ==
There are several examples of popular, real-world uses of infusing Positive Psychology in the workplace. In such contexts such as a workplace, researchers often hope to examine and measure variable levels of such factors such as productivity and organization. One such popular model is the aforementioned Job Characteristics Model (JCM), which applies influential theories of work as it correlates to the five central characteristics of skill variety, task identity, task significance, task autonomy, and task feedback. However, such practices such as business teams within a workplace often present the varying dynamics of positivity and negativity in business behaviors. There are often a plethora of special research teams that go into looking at certain workplaces in order to help report to employers the status of their employees. Furthermore, the three psychological states often measured and examined are: meaningfulness of performed work, responsibility of outcomes, and results knowledge. In mixing together these aspects, a score is generated in order to observe a range reflecting a job quality. In addition, each score details the differing degrees of autonomy and necessary feedback as it relates to ensuring high quality work. Most research points to the fact that typical teams of high performance are those that function high on positivity in their workplace behaviors.

== Controversies ==
There has been research regarding whether the practice of measuring positive behaviors is actually beneficial, in attempting to measure a variable to ensure a more positive environment in the workplace. There is debate concerning which proper components to value and measure. Additionally, the act and process of specifically looking into certain factors of productivity in the workplace can also go on to influence workers negatively due to the added pressure that it may place on those under review. It is suspected that avoiding all negativity can cause contentious interactions to escalade and increase, when they may have not even been an issue in the first place.

== See also ==
- Positive psychology
- Happiness at work
- Employee engagement
- Work engagement
- Booster Breaks in the Workplace
