= FQF =

FQF may refer to:

- FQF, code for Bogie stock ISO traffic Victorian Railways flat wagons
- French Quarter Festival, an annual music festival in New Orleans, Louisiana, U.S.
- French Quidditch Federation, member of the International Quadball Association
- FAA Quality Framework, guideline of the Finance Accreditation Agency
