= Heritage marketing =

Leveraging heritage in marketing strategy

Heritage marketing is a corporate communication strategy that highlights the history, traditions, and historical identity of a company or brand to build value and achieve competitive differentiation in today's market. Although heritage has always been used for marketing purposes, it became a distinct concept with the formation of marketing as an academic discipline in the 1950s. Heritage marketing received renewed academic attention in the 1980s coinciding with the rise of market segmentation as a marketing tool. Heritage marketing has also been used by governments to promote national identity, heritage tourism, conservationism, and other political and economic positions. In both public and private contexts, museums are often associated with heritage marketing.

Heritage marketing overlaps with retro marketing, which typically exploits nostalgia to promote new or updated retro style goods and services.

== See also ==
- Cultural heritage
- Brand
