= Common Impact =

American nonprofit organization

Common Impact is an American nonprofit organization headquartered in Boston, Massachusetts. It catalyzes a new, connected economy by aligning business and social purpose, connecting business professionals to local nonprofits that need assistance in information technology, marketing, human resources, operations, and finance. Common Impact's model for social change involves social innovation, employee engagement, and corporate social responsibility.

== History ==
Theresa M. Ellis co-founded Common Impact in 2000 with Zach Goldstein, both graduates of Dartmouth College. Ellis helped connect her friend, an IT professional, to a Washington, D.C. nonprofit needing assistance with a database while she was working for another nonprofit. She founded Common Impact to help more corporate professionals volunteer their professional skills and help solve social problems in the areas of health, housing, and education.

== Projects ==
Many of the projects between corporate employees and nonprofit organizations involve improving databases, creating new marketing materials, and restructuring human resources tools. Before each project, Common Impact screens the nonprofit and matches it to a trained team of business professionals who are skilled in the project area. A few examples of projects include redesigning a website and evaluating marketing materials.

== Impact ==
Common Impact "helps nonprofits evaluate their internal operations. Then it finds corporate volunteers who can work with them to improve their technology, marketing, and human resource functions." These projects have generated over $6 million in resources for the nonprofit sector. Businesses are increasingly recognizing the importance of volunteering professional skills as more employees want to help their communities More than 400 corporate employees from companies such as Cisco, Genworth Financial, Fidelity Investments and State Street Corporation have volunteered their skills by working with Common Impact. Some examples of projects Fidelity Investments volunteers worked on are fundraising, case management, databases, and website design. The organization has connected business professionals to over 150 nonprofit organizations in Greater Boston, New York City, and Richmond, Virginia. The employee engagement relationships Common Impact fosters have translated into an estimated 9,000 hours of skilled volunteer time donated to nonprofit organizations.

== See also ==
- Venture philanthropy
- Capacity building
