= BIX Malaysia =

Nonprofit organization based in Malaysia

Bond and Sukuk Information Exchange (BIX)
- Company type: Nonprofit organization
- Industry: Financial services
- Founded: November 6, 2017; 8 years ago
- Headquarters: 3, Persiaran Bukit Kiara, Bukit Kiara, 50490 Kuala Lumpur, Malaysia
- Website: www.bixmalaysia.com

The Bond and Sukuk Information Exchange (BIX) is a non-profit organisation information platform which provides free public access to information on bond and sukuk (Islamic bond) issued in Malaysia. The BIX, a comprehensive and up-to-date information on the Malaysia bond and sukuk market, also provides an increase in transparency in both the primary market and secondary market. BIX function also aims to facilitate investors increased awareness. It is being launched by the Securities Commission Malaysia (SC) as the market is being opened to retail investors.

BIX information platform targeting to promote Malaysia as a global benchmark for transparency and leaders to bond and sukuk hub in the region. BIX website provides an advanced search engine which allows investors to search bond and sukuk in Malaysia by filtering their expected yield, duration, and rating. Their website also features a bond calculator that can calculate the expected return based on the bond and sukuk maturity and coupon/profit payment.

== History ==
BIX was officially launched on November 6, during SCxSC Digital Finance Conference 2017. BIX role is to provide easier access and comprehensive information on corporate bond and sukuk. The chairman of the SC stated that the BIX platform would provide “a public utility and cornerstone component of our overall bond and sukuk infrastructure”.

== Structure and location ==
BIX will be under the supervision of the Securities Commission Malaysia and is subject to its regulations and guidelines. The BIX Malaysia has a board of directors made up of three members from the industry leaders. They are:

- Dato' Lee Kok Kwan (Chairman)
- Datin Nor Hanifah Hashim
- Mr Steven Choy Khai Choon

The BIX Malaysia is located in Bukit Kiara near National Science Centre, Kuala Lumpur.

== See also ==
- Securities Commission Malaysia
