= Finance Accreditation Agency =

- Abbreviation: FAA
- Established: 2 August 2012
- Purpose: Professional Programmes Accreditation for Financial Services Industry
- Headquarters: Bangsar South, Kuala Lumpur, Malaysia
- CEO: Dr Amat Taap Manshor
- Website: http://www.faa.org.my

The Finance Accreditation Agency (FAA) is an agency of the Government of Malaysia that accredits financial training courses offered by companies in Malaysia and other countries. Founded in 2012, the FAA is headquartered in Bangsar South, Kuala Lumpur.

The FAA was commissioned by the Central Bank of Malaysia and Securities Commission Malaysia to be responsible for the quality assurance of learning initiatives within the Financial Services Industry (FSI), on learning programme accreditation.

The FAA accredits more than 300 training providers in Malaysia and European, Middle East and North Africa providers. Since its establishment on 2 August 2012, the Agency has accredited more than 70 learning programs both locally and internationally.

== History ==
Initially part of Asian Institute of Finance, FAA was initiated to spearhead the standardisation and certification effort in the financial services in August 2012, headquartered in Bangsar South, Kuala Lumpur. Its ambit has expanded substantially, embracing a wide range of types of accreditation from programme accreditation to institutional and individual accreditation.

== Roles and functions ==
The roles and functions of FAA are as follows:

- Establish criteria for quality assurance and accreditation framework;
- Approve and/or accredit learning programmes that fulfil the set criteria and principles;
- Promote and implement recognition of prior learning standards and practices;
- Register and maintain the approved and accredited learning programmes and qualifications in the FSI;
- Seek global recognition of learning and qualifications;
- Facilitate the recognition and articulation of learning programmes and qualifications through mutual recognition initiatives; and
- Seek accreditation and strategic alliances with local and world-renowned accreditation agencies and relevant institutions.

== FAA Accreditation Panelists ==
FAA Accreditation Panelists consist of local and international panel members who have specific roles such as to provide technical guidance and endorse accreditation for certification to verify whether a learning programme conforms to the learning criteria and industry requirements. These industry committee members and panelists represent a cross section of industry with external perspectives with regards to industry relevance and requirements.

== Scope of FAA Accreditation ==
Accreditation is the prevalent form of quality assurance internationally and is an established and recognised practice in ensuring quality of a learning programme, institution and competencies of an individual. Most importantly, accreditation assures industry, regulators and training providers that accredited learning programmes or institutions are trustworthy and reliable; and that accredited individuals are competent of their roles.

Hence all teaching, learning and all other related activities of a learning programme provided by the FSI training providers must meet the FAA Learning Criteria (FLC) and are in compliance with the FAA Quality Framework (FQF) as well as the FSI requirements.
