= Happiness at work =

Despite a large body of positive psychological research into the relationship between happiness and productivity, happiness at work has traditionally been seen as a potential by-product of positive outcomes at work, rather than a pathway to business success. Happiness in the workplace is usually dependent on the work environment. During the past two decades, maintaining a level of happiness at work has become more significant and relevant due to the intensification of work caused by economic uncertainty and increase in competition. Nowadays, happiness is viewed by a growing number of scholars and senior executives as one of the major sources of positive outcomes in the workplace. In fact, companies with higher than average employee happiness exhibit better financial performance and customer satisfaction. It is thus beneficial for companies to create and maintain positive work environments and leadership that will contribute to the happiness of their employees.

Happiness is not fundamentally rooted in obtaining sensual pleasures and money, but those factors can influence the well-being of an individual at the workplace. However, extensive research has revealed that freedom and autonomy at a workplace have the most effect on the employee's level of happiness, and other important factors are gaining knowledge and the ability to influence the self's working hours.

== Definition ==
Ryan and Deci offer a definition for happiness in two views: happiness as being hedonic, accompanied with enjoyable feelings and desirable judgements, and happiness as being eudemonic, which involves doing virtuous, moral and meaningful things. Watson et al. claims that the most important approach to explain an individual's experience is in a hedonic tone, which is concerned with the subject's pleasant feelings, satisfying judgments, self-validation and self-actualization. However, some psychologists argue that hedonic happiness is unstable over a long period of time, especially in the absence of eudaimonic well-being. Thus, in order for one to live a happy life one must be concerned with doing virtuous, moral and meaningful things while utilising personal talents and skills.

== Antecedents ==
=== Organisational culture ===
Organisational culture represents the internal work environment created for operating an organisation. It can also represent how employees are treated by their bosses and peers. An effective organisation should have a culture that takes into account employee's happiness and encourages employee satisfaction. Although each individual has unique talents and personal preferences, the behaviors and beliefs of the people in the same organizations show common properties. This, to some extent, helps organisations to create their own cultural properties.

Jarow concludes that an employee feels satisfied not through comparisons with other peers, but through his/her own happiness and awareness of being in harmony with their colleagues. He uses a term called "carrier" to represent lack of happiness, life in constant tension and never-ending struggle for status.

=== Employee salary ===
There are many reasons that can contribute to happiness at work. However, when individuals are asked with regards to why they work, money is one of the most common answers as it provides people with sustenance, security and privilege. To a large extent, people work to live, and the pecuniary aspect of the work is what sustains the living. Locke, Feren, McCaleb Shaw and Denny argued that no other incentive or motivational technique comes even close to money with respect to its instrumental value.

The income-happiness relationship in life can also be applied in organisational psychology. Some studies have found positively significant relationships between salary level and job satisfaction. Some have suggested that income and happiness at work are positively correlated, and the relationship is stronger for individuals with extrinsic value orientations.

However, others don't believe that salary, in itself, is a very strong factor in job satisfaction. Hundreds of studies and scores of systematic reviews of incentive studies consistently document the ineffectiveness of external rewards. The question regarding this subject has been recently studied by a group of people, including Judge and his colleagues. Their research shows that the intrinsic relationship between job and salary is complex. In their research, they analysed the combined impact of many existing studies to produce a much larger and statistically powerful analysis. By looking at 86 previous studies, they concluded that while it is true to say that money is a driver of employee's happiness, the produced effect is transitory. Judge and his colleagues have reminded us that money may not necessarily make employees happy.

=== Job security ===
Job security is an important factor to determine whether employees feel happiness at work. Different types of jobs have different levels of job security: in some situations, a position is expected to be offered for a long time, whereas in other jobs an employee may be forced to resign his/ her job. The expectation of the job availability has been related with the job-related well-being and a higher level of job security corresponds to a higher level of job satisfaction alongside a higher level of well-being.

=== Career development ===
The option for moving or shifting to alternative roles motivates the employee's participation in the workplace meaning if an employee can see the future potential for a promotion, motivation levels will increase. By contrast, if an organisation does not provide any potential for higher status position in the future, the employee's effectiveness in work will decrease. In addition, the employee may consider whether or not the position would be offered to them in the future. On the other hand, not all of the opportunities for transferring into another activity are aimed to obtain the upward movement. In some cases, they are aimed to prevent the skills obsolescence, provides more future career possibility, as well as directly increasing the skill development.

=== Job autonomy ===
Job autonomy may be defined as the condition of being self-governing or free from excessive external control in the workplace environment. The German philosopher Immanuel Kant believed that autonomy is important to human beings because it is the foundation of human dignity and the source of all morality. Among the models of human growth and development that are centred on autonomy, the most theoretically sophisticated approach has been developed around the concepts of self-regulation and intrinsic motivation. Self-determination theory proposes that 'higher behavioural effectiveness, greater volitional persistence, enhanced subjective well-being, and better assimilation of the individual within his or her social group' result when individuals act from motivations that emanate from the inner self (intrinsic motivation) rather than from sources of external regulation. For self-determination theorists, it is the experience of an external locus of causation (or the belief that one's actions are controlled by external forces) that undermines the most powerful source of natural motivation and that (when chronic) also can lead to stultification, weak self-esteem, anxiety and depression, and alienation. Thus, health and well-being as well as effective performance in social settings are closely related to the experience of autonomy. Hackman and Oldham developed the Job Characteristics Model, a framework that focused attention on autonomy and four other key factors involved in designing enriched work. Work designed to be complex and challenging (characterized by high levels of autonomy, skill variety, identity, significance, and feedback) was theorized to promote high intrinsic motivation, job satisfaction, and overall work performance. Two decades of research in this tradition have shown that job scope or complexity, an additive combination of autonomy and the four other job characteristics: (a) is correlated significantly with more objective ratings of job characteristics; (b) may be reduced to a primary factor consisting of autonomy and skill variety; and (c) has substantial effects on affective and behavioural reactions to work, mostly indirectly through critical psychological states such as experienced responsibility for the outcomes of the work. It is possible to infer from this line of research that the experience of autonomy at work has positive consequences ranging from higher job performance to job satisfaction and enhanced general well-being, which are both related to the concept of happiness at work. However, Dysvik and Kuvaas highlight that employees with lower intrinsic motivation may require more structure and support to perform well. This complexity is further illustrated by the findings of Preenen et al., who noted that job autonomy's effects on performance indicators such as motivation to learn and commitment are moderated by the maturity of the company.

=== Work–life balance ===
Work–life balance is a state of equilibrium, characterised by a high level of satisfaction, functionality, and effectiveness while successfully performing several tasks simultaneously. The non-work activity is not limited to family life only but also to various occupations and activities of which one's life is composed. Scholars and popular press articles have started promoting the importance of maintaining a work–life balance beginning in the early 1970s and have been increasing ever since. Studies suggest that there is a clear connection between the increase in work related stress to the constant advancements in digital and telecommunications technology. The existence of cell phones and other internet based devices enables access to work related issues in non- working periods, thus, adding more hours and work load. A decrease in the time allocated to non- work related activities and working nonstandard shifts has been proven to have significant negative effects on family and personal life. The immediate effect is a decrease in general well- being as the individual is unable to properly allocate the appropriate amount of time necessary to maintain a balance between the two spheres. Therefore, extensive research has been done on properly managing time as a main strategy of managing stress. It is estimated by the American Psychological Association that the national cost of stress for the US economy is approximately US$500 billion annually.

Research recommends there are five stressors related to the workplace (perceived job intensity, limited workspace, technostress, work interdependence, and professional isolation) and three stressors unrelated to the workplace (intensity of housework, care work, and emotional demands).

Some of the physiological effects of stress include cognitive problems (forgetfulness, lack of creativity, inefficient decision making), emotional reactions (mood swings, irritability, depression, lack of motivation), behavioural issues (withdrawal from relationships and social situations, neglecting responsibilities, abuse of drugs and alcohol) and physical symptoms (tiredness, aches and pain, loss of libido).

The condition in which work performance is negatively affected by a high level of stress is termed 'burnout', in which the employee experiences a significant reduction in motivation. According to Vroom's Expectancy Theory, when the outcomes of work performance are offset by the negative impacts on the individual's general well-being, or, are not valued enough by the employee, levels of motivation are low. Time management, prioritising certain tasks and actions according to one's values and beliefs are amongst the suggested course of action for managing stress and maintaining a healthy work–life balance. Psychologists have suggested that when workers have control over their work schedule, they are more capable of balancing work and non- work related activities. The difficulty of distinguishing and balancing between those spheres was defined by sociologist Arlie Russell Hochschild as Time Bind. The reality of constant increase in competition and economic uncertainty frequently forces the employee to compromise the balance for the sake of financial and job security. Therefore, work–life balance policies are created by many businesses and are largely implemented and dealt by line managers and supervisors, rather than at the organizational level as the employee's well-being can be more carefully observed and monitored.

=== Working relationship ===
According to Maslow's hierarchy of needs, feeling a sense of belonging to groups is a significant motivation for human beings. Co-workers are an important social group and relationships with them can be a source of pleasure. Three Need theory also suggests that people have a Need for affiliation. Also, person-job fit, the matching between personal abilities and job demand, has important effects on job satisfaction.

==== Group relationship ====
Herzberg's Two-Factor theory indicates that co-workers relationship belongs to hygiene needs, which are related to environmental elements. When environmental elements are met, satisfaction will be achieved. Employees tend to be happier and more hardworking when they are in good working environment, for instance, being happy to work in a good working relationship.

Group relationship is important and has effects on employees' absenteeism and turnover rate. Cohesive groups increase job satisfactions. Mann and Baumgartel state that the sense of group belongingness, group pride, group solidarity or group spirit relates inversely to the absenteeism rate. Among the target groups, group with high cohesiveness tend to have low absenteeism rate while group with low cohesiveness tend to have higher absenteeism rate.

Seashore investigated 228 work groups in a heavy-machinery-manufacturing company. His findings suggest that Group cohesiveness helps employees solve their work-related pressure. Seashore define cohesiveness as '1) members perceive themselves to be a part of a group 2) members prefer to remain in the group rather than to leave, and 3) perceive their group to be better than other groups with respect to the way the men get along together, the way they help each other out, and the way they stick together'. Among the target group, the less cohesive the group, the more likely its employees are to feel nervous and jumpy.

Different communication ways in groups contribute to different employees satisfaction. For example, the chain structure results in low satisfaction while the circle structure results in high satisfaction.

==== Leadership ====
In relations to the work place, successful leadership will structure and develop relationships amongst employees and consequently, employees will empower each other.

Kurt Lewin argued that there are 3 main styles of leaderships:

1. Autocratic leaders: control the decision-making power and do not consult team members.
2. Democratic leaders: include team members in the decision-making process but make the final decisions.
3. Laissez-faire leaders: team members have huge freedom in how they do their work, and how they set their deadlines.

Management plays an important role in an employee's job satisfaction and happiness. Good leadership can empower employees to work better towards reaching the organisation's goals. For example, if a leader is considerate, the employees will tend to develop a positive attitude towards management and thus, work more effectively.

Feelings, including happiness, are often hidden by employees and should be identified for effective communication in the workplace. Ineffective communication at work is not uncommon, as leaders tend to focus on their own matters and give less attention to employees at a lower rank. Employees, on the other hand, tend to be reluctant to talk about their own problem and assume leaders can figure out the problem. As a result, both leaders and employees can cause repetitive misunderstandings.

== Consequences ==
=== Job performance ===
Research shows that employees who are happiest at work are considered to be the most efficient and display the highest levels of performance. For instance, the iOpener Institute found that a happy worker is a high-performing one. The happiest employees only take one-tenth the sick leave of their least happy colleagues as they are in better physical and psychological health than their colleagues. Furthermore, happier employees display a higher level of loyalty, as they tend to stay for far longer periods in their organizations. Happiness at work is the feeling that employee really enjoy what they do and they are proud of themselves, they enjoy people being around, thus they have better performance.

=== Absence from work ===
Employees' behaviour can be influenced by happiness or unhappiness. People would like to participate in work when they feel happiness, or in the converse, absenteeism might occur. Absenteeism can be defined as the lack of physical presence at a given place and time determined by an individual's work schedule.

Although employee absenteeism is usually associated with the job-related well-being or simply whether the employee feels happiness during the work, other factors are also important. Firstly, the health constraints such as being ill would force the employee absence from the work. Secondly, social and families pressure can also influence the employee's decision to participate in the work.

=== Employee turnover ===
Employee turnover can be considered as another result derived from employee happiness. In particular, it is more likely that individual employees are able to deal with stress and passive feelings when they are in good mood. As people spend a considerable amount of time in the workplace, factors such as employee relationship, organizational culture and job performance can have a significant impact on work happiness. What is more, Avey and his colleagues use a concept called psychological capital to link employee satisfaction with work related outcomes, especially turnover intention and actual turnover. However, their findings were limited due to some reasons. For example, they omitted an important factor, which was emotional stability. Additionally, other researchers have pointed out that the relationship between work happiness and turnover intention is generally low, even if a dissatisfied employee is more likely to quit his/her job than the satisfied one. Therefore, whether or not employee happiness can be linked with employee's turnover intention is still a moot point.

=== Wellbeing during workforce transitions ===
Employee happiness and wellbeing are particularly vulnerable during periods of organizational change, including redundancies, restructuring, and role transitions. Research indicates that employees who receive structured wellbeing and career support during these periods demonstrate greater resilience, faster recovery of workplace engagement, and reduced rates of prolonged unemployment compared to those who do not receive such support. Organizations that invest in transition support programs have also been to maintain higher morale among remaining employees, mitigating the negative effects of survivor syndrome - the guilt and anxiety experienced by employees who remain after colleagues have been made redundant.

== Measurement ==
There are a few surveys used to measure the happiness or well-being level of people in different countries such as the World Happiness Report, the Happy Planet Index and the OECD Better Life Index. There are also surveys created to assess the job satisfaction level of employees. Job satisfaction is a different concept from happiness, but it is positively correlated to happiness and subjective well-being. The main job satisfaction scales are: The Job Satisfaction Survey (JSS), The Job Descriptive Index (JDI) and The Minnesota Satisfaction Questionnaire (MSQ). The Job Satisfaction Survey (JSS) assesses nine facets of job satisfaction, as well as overall satisfaction. The facets include pay and pay raises, promotion opportunities, relationship with the immediate supervisor, fringe benefits, rewards given for good performance, rules and procedures, relationship with coworkers, type of work performed and communication within the organization. The scale contains thirty-six items and uses a summated rating scale format. The JSS can provide ten scores. Each of the nine subscales produce a separate score and the total of all items produces a total score. The Job Descriptive Index (JDI) scale assesses five facets which are work, pay, promotion, supervision and coworkers. The entire scale contains seventy-two items with either nine or eighteen items per subscale. Each item is an evaluative adjective or short phrase that is descriptive of the job. The individual has to respond "yes", "uncertain" or "no" for each item. The Minnesota Satisfaction Questionnaire (MSQ) has two versions, a one hundred item long version and a twenty item short form. It covers twenty facets including activity, independence, variety, social status, supervision (human relations), supervision (technical), moral values, security, social service, authority, ability utilization, company policies and practices, compensation, advancement, responsibility, creativity, working conditions, coworkers, recognition and achievement. The long form contains five items per facet, while the short one contains only one.

== Statistics ==
University of Kent research show that career satisfaction stems from living near work, access to the outdoors, mindfulness, flow, non open plan offices, absence of many tight deadlines or long hours, small organisations or self-employment, variety, friends at work, working on a product or service from start to finish, focus, financial freedom, autonomy, positive feedback, helping others, purpose/goals, learning new skill and challenges.

Doctor, dentist, armed forces, teacher, leisure/tourism and journalist are the 6 happiest graduate jobs while social worker, civil servant, estate agent, secretary and administrator are the 5 least happy. According to one study Clergy, CEO's, Agriculturist, Company Secretaries, Regulatory professional, Health managers, Medical Professionals, Farmers and Accommodation managers are the happiest jobs in that order in another study.

On the other hand, social workers, nurses, social workers, medical doctors, and psychiatrists abuse substances and incur mental ill-health at among the highest rates of any occupation. For instance, the psychiatrist burnout rate is 40%.

== Burn Out ==
An IHI study done in 2017 looked into Framework for Improving Joy in Work displays burnout as a rising issue in the healthcare industry. Its poorly designed daily work system demand long hours, depleting the resources and energy of its workers. This lowers engagement, morale, and patient experience and increases the probability of accidents. The ability to empathise and connect with patients is a crucial role healthcare workers need to have, but with over 50% physicians reporting symptoms of burnout and 33% of newly registered nurses looking to find new jobs within a year, quality of care is falling. The IHI guided leaders to engage in a set of 4 steps in order to find a path to switching these statistics. Step one involves collaborating with employees on a tailored infrastructure that identifies contributors and detractors from enjoying work. Leaders are able to find out what matters to their employees at work. Step two is identifying impediments to what matters. This encapsulates professional, social, and psychological needs. In step three, everyone in the workplace comes together to share ideas on improving identified impediments. By supporting a collaborative environment from all levels at the workplace, step four uses daily improvement science to measure what is working and apply it to each level of employment.

== Job Satisfaction in Well-Educated Populations ==
This study takes a pool of 1,000 working adults in Italy and examines job satisfaction through knowledge, attitudes, and practices. One third of the participants reported low satisfaction and expressed stress, an unmanageable workload, or negative feelings about commuting to work. The KAP (Know, Attitude, Practice) model is a tool used to measure what people do (P) as a result of what they know (K) and believe (A). The conclusion of the study shows that when workplace policies and information initiatives about work-life coping strategies (social and psychological) are highlighted, job satisfaction becomes more attainable for employees.

== Money and Happiness ==
The authors in this research report (Oishi, S., Cha, Y., Komiya, A., & Ono, H) pool data from the U.S., Japan, Europe, and Latin America to examine how the relationship between income and the quality of life has changed over time. Instead of asking "Does money = happiness?", the question was "Has money become more or less important for happiness?" They found that how much someone earns isn't directly linked to happiness, but rather to how economically satisfied their society is and how much they earn relative to others. When there is a significant inequality gap within social status, job security, and access to healthcare and education, income and quality of life become strongly correlated.

== Employee Well-being: Meta-Analysis ==
A 2026 meta-analysis done by Thi Phuong Thao Diep and Petra Horvathova accumulated 20 studies from 2016 to 2023 on employee well-being. The exact link between human resource management (HRM) and employee happiness is unclear, but Diep and Horvathova wanted to examine any correlation between the two. They found that HRM improves performance, but it isn't always positive. HR practices such as training or rewards for well-done work were thought to boost job satisfaction, engagement, and productivity. This could simultaneously create unwanted stress, exhaustion, and pressure. This not only brings down employee well-being but business performance as well. Strong leadership and environments where employees are encouraged to speak up can reduce these negative effects.

== See also ==
- Critique of work
- Decent work
- Dignity of labour
- Happiness economics
- Job satisfaction
- Philosophy of happiness
- Positive psychology in the workplace
- Salutogenesis § Workplace
- Workplace wellness
