= Decent work =

Employment that respects the fundamental rights of the human person

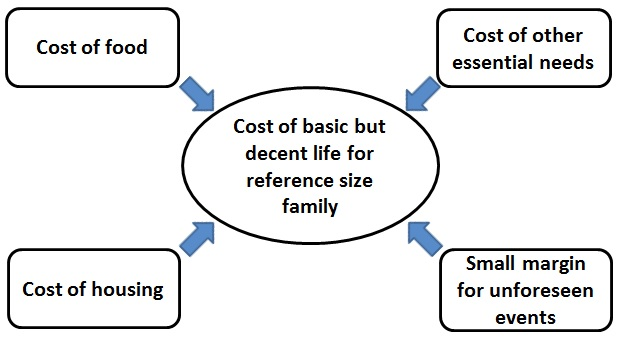
Cost of basic but decent living

Decent work is employment that "respects the fundamental rights of the human person as well as the rights of workers in terms of conditions of work safety and remuneration. ... respect for the physical and mental integrity of the worker in the exercise of their employment."

Decent work is applied to both the formal and informal sector. It must address all kind of jobs, people and families. According to the International Labour Organization (ILO), decent work involves opportunities for work that are productive and deliver a fair income, security in the workplace and social protection for families, better prospects for personal development and social integration, freedom for people to express their concerns, organize and participate in the decisions that affect their lives and equality of opportunity and treatment for all women and men.

The ILO is developing an agenda for the community of work, represented by its tripartite constituents, to mobilize their considerable resources to create those opportunities and to help reduce and eradicate poverty. The ILO Decent Work Agenda is the balanced and integrated programmatic approach to pursue the objectives of full and productive employment and decent work for all at global, regional, national, sectoral and local levels. It has four pillars: standards and rights at work, employment creation and enterprise development, social protection and social dialogue.

== Elements ==
The elements of decent work are:

- Job Creation - no one should be barred from their desired work due to lack of employment opportunities
- Rights at Work, including minimum wage - Workers rights include the right to just and favourable conditions, days off, 8-hour days, non-discrimination and living wages for them and their families, amongst others
- Social Protection - all workers should have safe working conditions, adequate free time and rest, access to benefits like healthcare, pension, and parental leave, among many others
- Social Dialogue - workers should be able to exercise workplace democracy through their unions and negotiate their workplace conditions as well as national and international labour and development policies

== Sustainable development and decent work targets ==
Sustainable Development Goal 8

The Sustainable Development Goals also proclaims decent work for sustainable economic growth. The Goal aims to increase labour productivity, reduce the unemployment rate, and improve access to financial services and benefits. Encouraging entrepreneurship and job creation are key to this, as are effective measures to eradicate forced labour, slavery and human trafficking. With these targets in mind, the goal is to achieve full and productive employment, and decent work, for all women and men by 2030. The ILO Decent Work Agenda's areas of concern has been mentioned in other development targets such as in reducing poverty and increasing access to education. The UN believes that the ILO Decent Work Agenda plays an active role in achieving sustainable development.

== Challenges in implementation ==
Although few disagree with the Decent Work Agenda in principle, actually achieving decent work poses challenges and controversies. In Africa, for example, informal employment is the norm, while well-paying jobs that offer social-protection benefits are the exception. This has been attributed to difficulties in obtaining formal sector jobs due to the creasing pressure of globalization. But there do exist debates on whether reducing the size of the informal economy or organizing its members into trade unions would bring about social welfare.

In 2006, the ILO highlighted the range and breadth of "decent work deficits", including "unemployment and underemployment, poor quality and unproductive jobs, unsafe work and insecure income, rights that are denied and gender inequality" and drawing these deficits to the attention of states attending a meeting of the UN's Economic and Social Council (ECOSOC).

In order to achieve the Decent Work Agenda, national and international entities must commit to the objective of the creation of quality jobs and tackle its challenges. However, an obstacle is that it is difficult to convince the citizens of a country that aiding development and job creation abroad is also beneficial domestically. To remain competitive in the world economy, governments are tempted to close markets and lower labour standards which is believed to cause depressing wages and working conditions.

Various actors can affect the provision of decent work, although existing conditions and incentives do not always lend themselves to advancing the Decent Work Agenda. To illustrate:

- National governments create decent work through economic and industrial policies. However, the forces of globalization – such as downward pressures on wages and reduced macroeconomic policy flexibility – have diminished the ability of national governments to achieve this goal on their own.
- The European Union committed itself to "contribute" to the decent work agenda in its 2006 Communication, Promoting decent work for all: The EU contribution to the implementation of the decent work agenda in the world.

== World Day for Decent Work ==
October 7 is the World Day for Decent Work (WDDW). During that day trade unions, union federations and other workers' associations develop their actions to promote the idea of decent work. Actions vary from street demonstrations to music events or conferences held in many countries.

== Decent Work, Decent Life Campaign ==
Five organizations – Solidar, ITUC, ETUC, Social Alert International and the Global Progressive Forum – launched the Decent Work, Decent Life campaign at the World Social Forum in Nairobi in January 2007 and have since worked in an alliance to promote decent work for decent life as solution to poverty. The idea to run a campaign on decent work was conceived at the World Social Forum in 2005 in Porto Alegre. The campaign targets young people, trade union activists, non-governmental organizations and decision makers in developed and developing countries.

The campaign’s objectives focus on building awareness of decent work and on promoting decent work as the only sustainable way out of poverty, democracy and social cohesion.

=== Success ===
In November 2007, decision makers from European governments and institutions signed the Call to Action of the Decent Work, Decent Life Campaign adding up to the recognition of the Decent Work Agenda. "There is also a growing interest on the part of the EU and international civil society in decent work, as illustrated for instance by: the launch of the Decent Work/Decent Life [Campaign]…".

The campaign’s Call to Action focuses on seven issues, namely; decent work, workers’ rights, social protection, fair trade, international financial institutions, development aid and migration.

== Decent Work, Decent Life for Women Campaign ==
The Decent Work, Decent Life for Women Campaign was a two-year campaign launched on International Women’s Day 2008 (March 8) by the International Trade Union Confederation (ITUC) and the global union federations (GUF). The campaign aimed to advocate decent work for women and gender equality in labour policies and agreements and to seek gender equality in trade union structures, policies and activities. The second objective was aimed at increasing the number of women members in trade unions and women in elected positions.

The campaign's necessity stemmed from multiple forms of discrimination in both policy and practice being faced by women, such as the gender pay gap, the lack of maternity protection and higher unemployment rates. Because of the gender bias, women are often paid less and are not given the opportunities to advance in their careers compared to their male counterparts. In Asia, women are mostly employed in domestic work, which is one of the lowest paid, least valued, and least organised sectors. Women's wage growth rate in Asia, excluding China, from 2006 to 2011 was 0.9%.

At the moment 81 national centres in 56 countries participate with various events in this Campaign.

== See also ==
- Convention on domestic workers
- Critique of work
- Dignity of labour
- Forced labour
- Happiness at work
- International labour law
- International Labour Organization (ILO)
- International Monetary Fund (IMF)
- International Trade Union Confederation (ITUC)
- Job satisfaction
- Labor rights
- Neoliberalism
- Occupational safety and health
- Right to work
- Social clause
- Trade union
- Washington Consensus
- World Bank Group
- World Trade Organization (WTO)
