= Securities Commission Malaysia =

Malaysian statutory body

Securities Commission Malaysia (SC)
- Suruhanjaya Sekuriti Malaysia

Agency overview
- Formed: 1 March 1993; 33 years ago
- Jurisdiction: Malaysia
- Headquarters: Bukit Kiara, Kuala Lumpur
- Ministers responsible: Anwar Ibrahim, Minister of Finance; Amir Hamzah Azizan, Minister of Finance II
- Deputy Minister responsible: Lim Hui Ying, Deputy Minister of Finance
- Agency executive: Dato’ Mohammad Faiz Azmi, Chairman (since 16 June 2024)
- Key document: Securities Commission Act 1993
- Website: www.sc.com.my

The Securities Commission Malaysia (Malay: Suruhanjaya Sekuriti Malaysia) is a Malaysian statutory body with responsibility for the development and regulation of capital markets in the country. It is located in Bukit Kiara, near the National Science Centre of Kuala Lumpur.

== History ==
On 1 March 1993, the Securities Commission Malaysia was established as a self-funded statutory body. The body functions to serve as the authority in developing and maintenance of a secure, efficient and orderly operations of the capital markets in Malaysia. It is a regulator and enforces its regulations to ensure the growth of capital market activities and market institutions within the financial sector.

== Joint initiatives ==
In 2009 the commission and the Central Bank of Malaysia established the Asian Institute of Finance. They also established the Finance Accreditation Agency in 2013.

With Bursa Malaysia, they introduced Electronic Share Payment for e-payment of stock market transactions, and e-Dividend; both were announced in the 2010 budget.

== See also ==
- Asset management in Malaysia
- BIX Malaysia
- Securities Commission
- List of financial supervisory authorities by country
