= Green human resource management =

Academic concept

Green human resource management (Green HRM or GHRM) emerged as an academic concept from the debate of sustainable development and corporate sustainability. Wehrmeyer (1996) is often stated as laying the foundation with his idea that "if a company is to adopt an environmentally-aware approach to its activities, the employees are the key to its success or failure".

One of the most common definitions refers to GHRM as "the HRM aspects of Environmental Management". A broader definition considers GHRM as "phenomena relevant to understanding relationships between organizational activities that impact the natural environment and the design, evolution, implementation and influence of HRM systems."

Some goals of GHRM include alerting employees to global environmental issues through initiating proposal schemes, training employees on greener practices, and encouraging employees to join and find sustainable initiatives. In addition to fostering sustainable workplaces, GHRM is considered a crucial step in working toward accomplishing the Sustainable Development Goals of the United Nations.

In May 2011, the German Journal of Human Resource Management published a special issue on GHRM, which comprises five contributions.

== GHRM practices ==
Research in GHRM often deals with concrete GHRM practices that are associated with basic functions in human resource management. In their literature review, Renwick et al. (2016) summarize recruitment and selection, training and development, management development and leadership as practices for developing abilities in environmental management. To motivate employees to behave environmentally friendly, they propose performance management and appraisal, pay, rewards, and organizational culture. Renwick et al. (2016) further mention employment relations and employee engagement as ways to facilitate opportunities for environmental management.

Studies show that GHRM practices are linked to enhanced pro-environmental behavior of individuals and improved environmental performance of organizations.

== See also ==
- Environmental management system
- Corporate social responsibility
