= Internal communications =

Organizational function or department

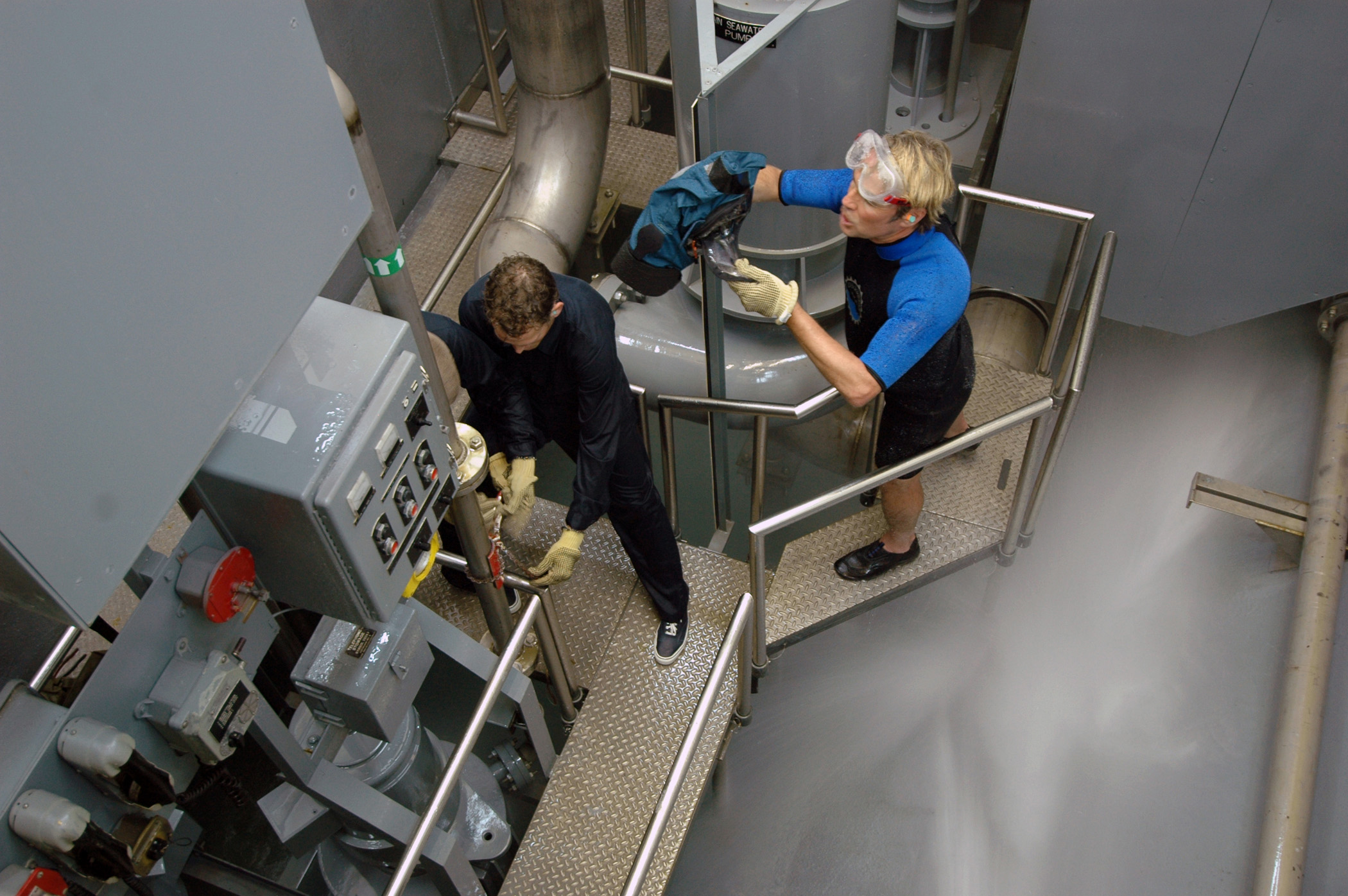
Filming a day's work for the US Armed Forces Network Television Services, an internal communication channel

Internal communications (IC) is the function responsible for effective communications among participants within an organization. The scope of the function varies by organization and practitioner, from producing and delivering messages and campaigns on behalf of management, to facilitating two-way dialogue and developing the communication skills of the organization's participants.

Internal communication is meant by a group of processes that are responsible for effective information circulation and collaboration between the participants in an organization. Modern understanding of internal communications is a field of its own and draws on the theory and practice of related professions, not least journalism, knowledge management, public relations (e.g., media relations), marketing and human resources, as well as wider organizational studies, communication theory, social psychology, sociology and political science.

== History of internal communications ==
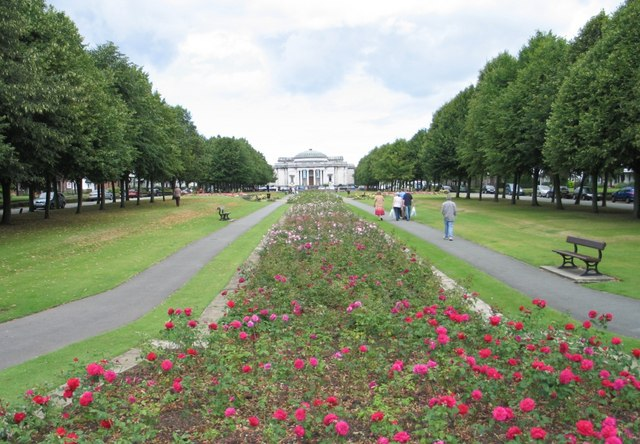
Lady Lever Art Gallery, built in 1888 as part of a model village for the workers of the Lever's soap factory - Port Sunlight, UK

Large organizations have a long history of promoting pride and a sense of unity among the employees of the company, evidenced in the cultural productions of Victorian-era soap manufacturers as far apart as the UK's Lever Brothers and the Larkin Soap Company of Buffalo, New York.

Internal communications is fundamentally a management discipline, but as a discrete discipline of organizational theory it is relatively young. Stanford associate professor Alex Heron's Sharing Information with Employees (1943) is an outlier among texts which focus solely on the factors involved. During the 1970s the subject attracted more attention in academic circles but it is only since around 2000 that employee communications has really attracted attention to a significant degree among scholars.

Writing in 2013, Ruck and Yaxley explore how the discipline evolved from the days of employee publications in the late 19th century. As organizations became more complex, the impetus to communicate with employees grew and led to the emergence of an increasingly specialised discipline.

In the UK in 2023, Michael Heller and Joe Chick were undertaking an Economic and Social Research Council-funded project, An Institutional History of Internal Communication in the UK. The project integrates historical research with organizational theory and involves 20 organizations, six involved in the practice of IC in the UK, and 14 which historically practiced internal communication.

== Role of IC in the organization ==
The job of an IC manager or IC team will vary from place to place and will depend on the needs of the organization they serve. In one, the IC function may perform the role of 'internal marketing' (i.e., attempting to win participants over to the management vision of the organization); in another, it might perform a 'logistical' service as channel manager; in a third, it might act principally as strategic adviser. Kevin Ruck argues that the role may include acting as the ears of the organization and a conduit for employee voice.

There is a practical distinction to make between managed communication and regular interactions among teams or between managers and subordinates. Minzberg talks about the fact that communicating is intrinsic to the work of a manager - especially so in an information society. Interpersonal communications in the workplace are explored by writers such as Phillip Clampitt and Hargie and Tourish.

There are a number of reasons why organizations should be concerned with internal communication. Employees are the heart and soul of an organization, thus it is critical to pay attention to their needs. An engaged and committed employee work force increases and drives business results. Employee engagement encourages higher employee performance, results in lower turnover and offers competitive advantage. Even in a difficult economy, companies need to inspire and retain high performers. Research undertaken in the United States and the UK in 2008 revealed "the scale and impact on businesses" of 'employee misunderstanding', defined as "actions taken by employees who have misunderstood or misinterpreted (or were misinformed about or lack confidence in their understanding) of company policies, business processes and/or job function".

Importantly, there is commonly a legal requirement for organizations to communicate with their workers. In large organizations in Europe, for example, the EU has made very specific provision about workers' rights to be informed and consulted with (Directive 94/45/EC on Works Councils).

Effective internal communications is commonly understood by practitioners to improve employee engagement (see, for example, the UK government-sponsored Macleod Report) and therefore to add significant value to organizations in terms of productivity, staff retention or external advocacy.

As noted in Quirke (2008): "Traditionally, internal communications has focused on the announcement of management conclusions and the packaging of management thinking into messages for mass distribution to the 'troops'". Research indicates a limit to the value of this 'broadcasting' model of IC. Without feedback loops and harnessing the active involvement and mediation skills of frontline supervisors or team leaders, broadcasting tends to be more effective at influencing senior and middle managers than frontline employees - see, for example, Larkin and Larkin (1994).

As the IC function matures within the organization, then, it may come to play a wider role in facilitating conversations "upwards", "downwards" and "across" the organization, per Stohl (1995). Organizations increasingly see IC as playing a role in external reputation management. Joep Cornelissen in his book Corporate Communications touches on the relationship between reputation and internal conversations. This trend reaches its full potential with the arrival of new 'norms' and customer expectations around social media, for example in the work of Scoble and Israel. Market researchers MORI have likewise highlighted the effects of employee advocacy on an organization's external reputation.

IC managers help senior leaders think strategically about how their decisions will be perceived internally and externally. The value added by a strong IC capability is typically explained as making a contribution to positive employee engagement.

== Internal communication strategy ==
As suggested above, employee communications strategy is founded on the essential question of what results does an organization need to achieve. Specifically, many practitioners talk in terms of 'outcomes' rather than 'outputs'; their concern is what actions are needed from employees rather than what tools or content should the IC team be producing. Some writers talk about the DO-FEEL-KNOW challenge. The actions needed of a workforce might be to work differently in support of a new business strategy, to follow safer practices or perhaps deliver a particular customer experience. The role of the internal communicator is to identify the behaviour required of staff and then consider what emotional and informational needs will help the staff adopt the desired behaviour.

Specific projects or programmes will then develop detailed plans which include insight into:

- Audience (or public) - who do we need to influence and what matters to them
- Messaging - what ideas are likely to inspire staff to follow the desired actions
- Overall approach - For example, is a campaigning approach needed, or will we be able to simply use a few articles in an internal publication? Is the intention to tell people, excite them or ask for their input?
- Channel choices - how can we reach all types of employees including front-line workers?
- Timescales and resources - what tools do we have available to reach employees?
- Evaluation and tracking - how will we know if we are achieving our results?

=== Message distribution ===
Formal channels typically fall into one of four broad categories:

- Electronic: Communications that are delivered and/or accessed electronically, either by computer, telephone, television or other devices. Examples include email, intranet, video and webcasts, DVD, electronic newsletters, podcasts, blogs, wikis, voicemail, conference calls, SMS text messaging, screensaver messaging, desktop news feeds, internal social media tools and team chat tools.
- Print: Paper-based communications. Examples include magazines, newsletters, brochures, postcards and other 'desk drops', posters, memos, communication packs or 'toolkits' for line managers, etc.
- Face-to-face: One-to-one and one-to-many forums where people are physically present. Examples include a 'cascade' of team meetings or briefings, conferences, site visits, 'back to the floor', consultation forums, 'brown bag' lunches, round-table discussions, 'town meetings', etc.
- Workspace: The working environment. Examples include notice boards, plasma and LCD screens, accessories (e.g.: mousemats), window decals, etc.

Informal channels reflect the non-linear dynamics of a social network and can be as influential, if not more so, than official channels, often more likely to stimulate and create discussion and dialogue. The channels may manifest themselves via the rumour-mill, water-cooler conversations, social networking, graffiti, spoof newsletters, etc.

==== Selecting channels ====
One of the key challenges any internal communicator will face is how to select the right channels - and the right mix of channels - for both the audience and the message. Bill Quirke offers a simplistic guide; see Weick for some theoretical grounds for this basic insight.

The practical considerations are:

- Availability: what channels either already exist within the organization or can be introduced effectively?
- Audience: who are they, where are they based, how do they prefer to access information and how effective will the proposed channel be in reaching them and engaging them?
- Objectives: what does the organization want people to learn, think, feel or do as a result of the message?
- Content: what is the context and substance of the message? (for example, sensitive messages may need to be communicated face-to-face, rather than by text message)
- Timing: how urgent is the message? (for example, communications in times of crisis which require quick dissemination of important messages)

==== Traffic control ====
A typical large organization IC function will be concerned to monitor and limit the quantity of information flowing through each internal channel, prioritising according to the relevance of a given message to the audience implicated in that channel, as well as the urgency and impact of the message. Such organizations typically face a risk that channels (such as intranet news, or email) are over-used for inappropriate, low value messages, causing vital audience groups to filter them out.

==== Channel development and administration ====
IC teams will often (but not always) hold responsibility for the administration and development of several of the organization's communications channels. The range of media available is wide - and growing fast with new electronic media. Initially, IC tends to focus on the existing resources of the organization, typically an intranet, email distributions, and newsletters.

One common element of channel development and administration involves managing supplier relationships - agencies external to the organization typically specialise in one main channel area, such as audiovisual, or print production.

==== Line manager 'cascade' ====
Sending information down the line to local supervisors, expecting them to deliver it without any corruption, interpretation or deviation has long been the main focus of 'cascaded' internal communications (for example, UK guidance from The Industrial Society, now The Work Foundation, focused on giving managers very clear instructions about what to say and how to say it). However, in recent years thinking has evolved and literature now concentrates on empowering managers to facilitate discussion rather than cascade management of messages which will have little authority or impact (this is a particularly strong theme in the writing of Larkin & Larkin). Clampitt (2005) lists three approaches managers use to communicate with their employees.

Employee communication is an important skill for all line managers, irrespective of their seniority. Like any skill it requires training and development. Often, organizations do not invest the appropriate amount of time and effort in developing managers' communications skills. Too often this leads to managers abdicating responsibility for communications to their 'internal communications department' and a lack of confidence in facilitating discussion in their teams. This raises debate around the following issues:

- The nature of supervisory relationships and organizational communication
- The potency of managers as a channel of official communications
- How best to support managers in their roles

FitzPatrick and Valskov argue that strong manager communication systems attempt to address five essential issues:

- Do managers understand that communication is part of their role - in general and on specific occasions or topics?
- Do managers have access to more detailed background or context - rather than just be supplied with the same material as their teams?
- Have managers received training or development to support their role?
- Are manager supplied with materials to make their task easier?
- What attention is given to their feedback?

==== Social media ====
Social media is becoming increasingly discussed in the field of internal communication. However, there is little documented, academic evidence of where it is being used successfully as part of a planned campaign of employee communications, and it is often confused with digital media. There are case studies published on a number of commercial websites including www.simply-communicate.com and www.melcrum.com (now defunct), and there is a useful chapter on the subject by Tracy Playle in Ruck's Exploring Internal Communication.

==== Other collaborative software ====
Since 2012, several communication technologies usually classified as workplace group chat apps or collaborative software have emerged.

=== Message design and production ===
Basic IC services to an organization begin with editorial services - either fine-tuning messages drafted by participants in the organization, or drafting new material on their behalf. IC practitioners might simply correct basic grammar, etc., especially in organizations where many participants may be operating in their second or third language. Or they might re-work it to conform to house style or its branded equivalent, 'tone of voice'. The skillset involved relates closely to media professions such as journalism, copywriting and film or print production. Message design may be iterative, or involve a range of participants in an approvals process.

=== Project communications ===
IC practitioners may be seconded to a specific project team, to support the stages of the project that carry a communications or engagement component. Project communicators might produce a schedule of communication objectives and milestones for the project; a map of vital stakeholders (senior individuals or large groups / segments of the overall population); and a message framework to guide project participants towards a single, coherent message about their work. They might also contribute to the project's aggregate risks 'log' on the reputational risks, and work-up contingency plans covering unintended situations.

==== Change communications ====
Most writers on the subject of communications talk about the idea of change. Most intentional communication takes place with the aim of effecting some kind of change or another. However, many practitioners in internal communications make a distinction between change and transformation.

Drawing on the work of writers such as William Bridges, practitioners talk of 'change' as the act of altering something within an organization (such as the introduction of a new IT system or the closure of an office) and they describe 'transition' as the process through which an individual passes as part of the process of coping with change. The use of the two terms interchangeably causes some confusion. Communicators who specialise in change communications tend to be interested in behaviour change and will draw heavily on psychological models.

There are important contributions made to the debate about practice in this area by Herrero and Quirke.

==== Crisis communications ====
Organizations occasionally face unplanned reputational crises which can destroy brand value or even finish the organization. At such moments, the support of the internal constituency becomes especially valuable, as employees' friends and relatives seek their account of events, and as talented and motivated participants consider whether or not to remain with the organization.

As with media relations and PR, the role IC plays in a crisis can be decisive for the success or failure of an organization, as it responds to a critical challenge. Organizations with a mature IC function may have contingency planning in place, ready to be tailored to the particulars of the situation. They are also more likely to have 'well flexed', well-rehearsed line management communications capability, making crisis communications more effective. Less mature IC functions may find it difficult to bring senior leaders' attention to the internal audience, when critical stakeholders such as investors or customers appear more likely to desert the organization.

Although unplanned and usually under-resourced, the quality of an IC function's response in a crisis often has a decisive impact in the maturing of an IC function within an organization. Effective responses bring IC up the list of priorities for senior leaders, following the crisis.

=== Internal communication roles ===
In recent years the practice of internal communications has professionalised.

In common with the Ulrich model for human resources practice, IC may be delivered via a 'business partnering' relationship, acting as adviser to a given function or unit on IC issues relevant to the delivery of their strategic plans and projects. As a representative of the audiences with a stake in the developments under discussion, this can be both an awkward and a privileged position to occupy, requiring skills of diplomacy and objectivity.

== IC associations and accreditation ==
Professional IC associations include the International Association of Business Communicators (IABC), and the Institute of Internal Communication (IoIC). In 2013, IABC closed its Accredited Business Communicator qualification, but planned to launch a Certification Programme for Strategic Communicators in Autumn 2014. The IoIC provides internal communication qualifications, training, awards, communities, and thought leadership; it also provides the IoIC Profession Map.

In the UK, the accreditation bodies representing the profession offer competing qualifications. The UK's Chartered Institute of Public Relations offers training and qualifications in internal communications including Diploma and Certificate courses. The IoIC provides three qualifications in internal communication including a Masters in Internal Communication Management, all academically accredited by Solent University in Southampton.

In Europe, related courses are available at the University of Lugano in Switzerland and Rotterdam School of Management in the Netherlands.

Internal communications remains an emerging field in Asia, with a limited number of specialists concentrated in more developed economies such as Singapore and Hong Kong, some of whom are accredited by the Singapore Business Advisors and Consultants Council.

== Synonyms ==
IC may variously be referred to as: employee communications, employee engagement, employee relations, internal marketing, company communications, staff communication. Responsibility for IC may sit within various established functions, including marketing, corporate communications, transformation, HR and the CEO office. Internal communications functions can require several skills, e.g.: writing, marketing, event organization, web production, facilitation, advertising, stakeholder management, corporate social responsibility, branding and communications training.

== See also ==
- Brand engagement
