= Asian Institute of Finance =

Malaysian nonprofit organisation

Coordinates: 03°07′56.5″N 101°41′03.5″E

Asian Institute of Finance Berhad
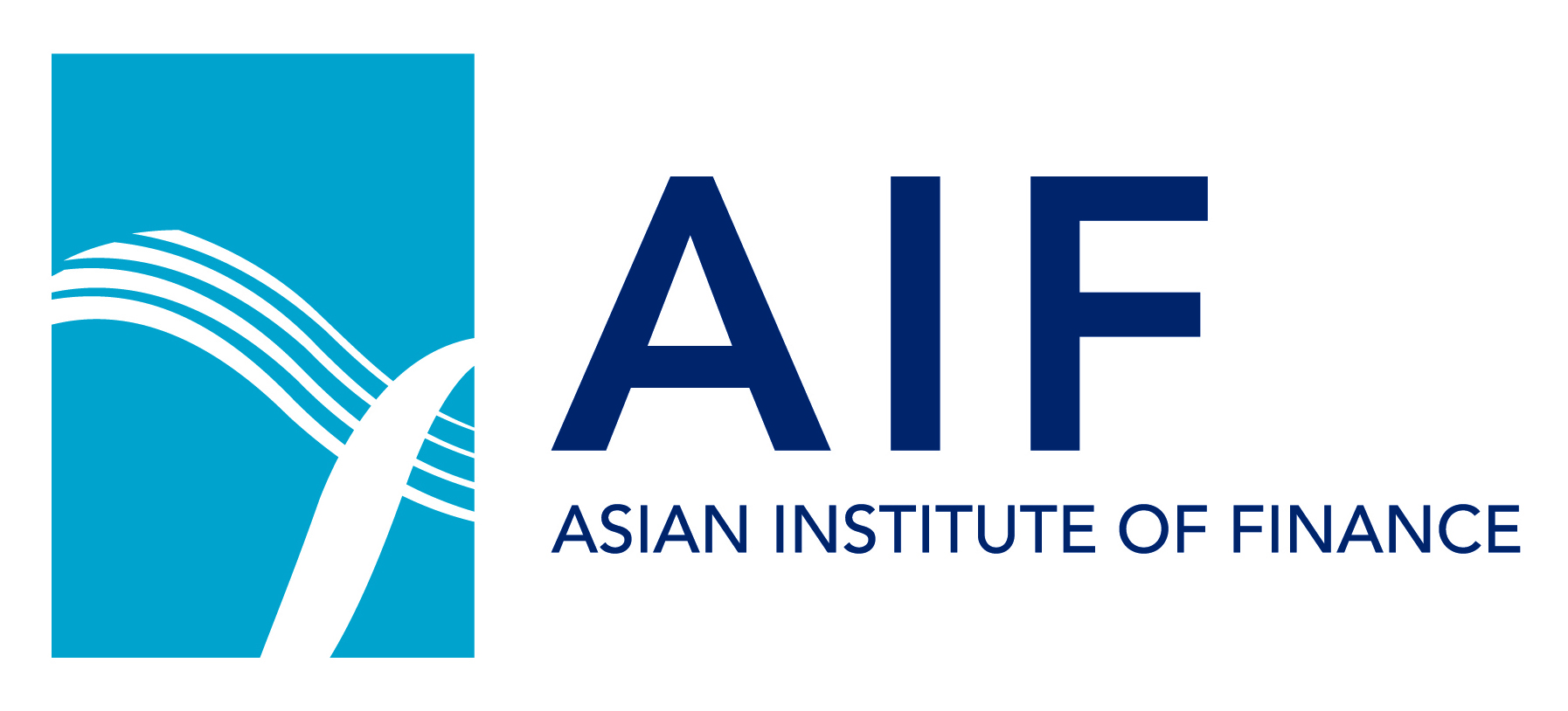
- Formation: 17 November 2008; 17 years ago
- Type: Nonprofit
- Registration no.: 838740P
- Legal status: Active
- Headquarters: Kuala Lumpur, Malaysia
- Location: Plaza Sentral, Kuala Lumpur, Malaysia
- Official language: English
- Board of directors: Tan Sri Dato' Seri Ranjit Ajit Singh (Vice Chairman, AIF Board), Tan Sri Azman Hashim, Datuk Seri Dr Nik Norzrul Thani bin Nik Hassan Thani, Mr Kung Beng Hong and Mr Ken Pushpanathan
- Parent organization: Central Bank of Malaysia and Securities Commission Malaysia
- Affiliations: Asian Institute of Chartered Bankers (AICB), Asian Banking School (ABS), Chartered Institute of Islamic Professionals (CIIF), Islamic Banking and Finance Institute of Malaysia (IBFIM), Securities Industry Development Corporation (SIDC) and The Malaysian Insurance Institute (MII)
- Staff: 35

The Asian Institute of Finance Berhad (AIF) is a nonprofit organisation in Malaysia. Its main purpose is to enhance human capital development and talent management across the Asian financial services industry. AIF's headquarters is located in Kuala Lumpur.

The institute attracts, develops and retains talented individuals towards ensuring the development and sustainability of the industry. It advocates this principle via domestic and regional alliances with industry, multilateral organisations and academia with the sole aim of raising the profile of the human capital and talent management agenda.

AIF works closely with Central Bank of Malaysia, Securities Commission Malaysia, Asian Institute of Chartered Bankers (AICB), Asian Banking School (ABS), Chartered Institute of Islamic Professionals (CIIF), Islamic Banking and Finance Institute of Malaysia (IBFIM), Securities Industry Development Corporation (SIDC) and the Malaysian Insurance Institute (MII) towards coordinating and enhancing content as well as delivery of professional qualifications in Malaysia.

== History ==
The AIF was jointly established by Central Bank of Malaysia and Securities Commission Malaysia on 17 November 2008. It was set-up under the 7th Governor of Central Bank of Malaysia, Malaysia's central bank, Tan Sri Dato' Sri Dr. Ungku Zeti Akhtar binti Ungku Abdul Aziz.

AIF conducts applied research and prepares case studies relating to talent management and human capital development issues in the financial services industry. AIF also works with the financial services industry to enhance the development, implementation and advocacy of professional standards and business ethics. AIF also acts as the secretariat for a voluntary industry-led body, called the Financial Services Professional Board (FSPB), which develops and advocates universal professional and ethical standards for the financial services industry. FSPB was launched in Malaysia by Central Bank of Malaysia and Securities Commission Malaysia on 24 September 2014. AIF also develops and monitors capacity building initiatives created by Central Bank of Malaysia and designed to drive efficiency, effectiveness and the structural development of the industry.

After the departure of Dr. Raymond Madden, CEO in 2018 the unit was disbanded by Bank Negara Malaysia in June 2019.

== Headquarters ==
The AIF headquarters is located at Plaza Sentral; off Jalan Stesen Sentral 5. The unit is now closed and no longer operates.

== Research ==
AIF delivers applied research in relation to human capital development and talent management focused on the financial services industry either independently or through its partnerships with industry, multilateral organisations and academia. The aim of its research is to provide a rigorous analysis and suggest possible solutions to the challenges faced by industry in the areas of talent attraction, development and retention. AIF also publishes a regular journal, Asian Link, which provides different perspectives from industry leaders on issues and trends in the industry particularly in relation to human capital management. AIF leads several industry-wide initiatives aimed at addressing talent issues facing the industry. AIF's research is also available on The Asia-Pacific Research Exchange (ARX), a regional research hub for finance and investment management professionals to learn and engage on important industry topics and trends specific to the Asia-Pacific region.

AIF has produced a series of research studies on millennials. This has included studies into debt among millennials in Malaysia as well as research into millennials in other ASEAN countries including Indonesia, Thailand and Singapore.

AIF has also studied remuneration in the financial services sector and digitalisation in financial services including a 2017 study on enhancing digital trust in online banking and insurance. Another study found that crowdfunding is expected to grow as a critical source of funding for micro, small and medium-sized enterprises in Malaysia.

AIF examines some of the key issues and challenges facing the human resources function and human resources professionals including high performance work practices and the need for human resources transformation in the financial services sector. AIF frequently partners with academic organisations to conduct research and university partners publish this research on their own behalf in international academic journals. In 2017, AIF published a study on the importance of Green Human Resource Management (GHRM) in the Malaysian financial services industry.

== Other initiatives ==
AIF provides a platform for business leaders, academics and human capital experts to discuss some of the most pertinent issues facing businesses in Malaysia and regionally. Speakers AIF has hosted include Tan Sri Andrew Sheng, Professor Dave Ulrich, Professor Kishore Mahbubani, Professor John Kay, Manfred F.R. Kets de Vries and Brett King. AIF is often called to participate at international conferences to share its findings.
