= Dave Ulrich =

American academic and speaker (born 1953)

- Born: David Olson Ulrich; 1953 (age 72–73); Ely, Nevada, U.S.
- Education: Brigham Young University (BA)
- Occupations: Professor, management consultant, author, speaker

David Olson Ulrich (born 1953) is a university professor, author, speaker, management coach, and management consultant. He is a professor of business at the Ross School of Business, University of Michigan and co-founder of The RBL Group. He has written over 30 books with his colleagues which have shaped the human resources profession, defined organizations as capabilities, and shown the impact of leadership on customers and investors. Ulrich served on the Board of Directors for Herman Miller for 17 years, is a Fellow in the National Academy of Human Resources, and served on the Board of Trustees of Southern Virginia University for 9 years.

Dave Ulrich has been ranked the #1 Management Educator & Guru by BusinessWeek, selected by Fast Company as one of the 10 most innovative and creative leaders, is one of 21 people in the Thinker's Fifty Hall of Fame, and named the most influential thinker in HR of the decade by HR magazine.

== Early life and work ==
Ulrich was born in the small town of Ely, Nevada and grew up in Oregon. His father worked as a forester building campgrounds, then transferred in order to direct social programs for Job Corps. His mother spent time in church and community service. From his parents, he learned the importance of service and the value of hard work. The Ulrich family lived in Kansas City, Missouri where he attended high school.

Ulrich attended Brigham Young University where he completed his undergraduate degree in University Studies in five semesters and began graduate school in Organizational Behavior. He earned a PhD in Business (Organization Theory) from the University of California, Los Angeles. He has been awarded honorary doctorates by Abertay University in Dundee, Scotland and by Utah Valley University (2020).

== Research and career ==
Dave Ulrich’s professional focus has addressed questions on how organizations add value to customers and investors through both talent, leadership, organization, and human resource practices. In the human resource area, he and his colleagues have worked to redefine and upgrade HR. With his colleagues, Ulrich has articulated how the modern HR organization can be organized into shared services, centers of expertise, and business partners. He has also co-directed research on over 125,000 respondents about the competencies required for successful HR professionals; in addition, he has helped shape thinking on how to transform HR practices so that they are aligned to customer needs and integrated around organizational capabilities.

In the leadership area, Ulrich has co-authored several works with organizational development consultant Norm Smallwood. They co-founded The RBL Group in 1999. Smallwood and Ulrich have worked to focus on the outcomes of effective leadership; they have also shown how leadership will increase customer share by creating a leadership brand within the company. Their work also illustrates that investing in leadership will increase shareholder value. Their work also synthesizes the thicket of leadership competency models into a unified view of leadership. Their current work attempts to look at leadership through the eyes and expectations of investors.. Ulrich spoke as part of the Asian Institute of Finance's Distinguished Speaker Series in 2014. In addition, he has shown how leadership can impact investor value by creating a leadership capital index that can be used in private equity, investor relations, boards of directors, and other settings. In the organization area, he has defined organizations as capabilities and written about culture change, learning, collaboration, change, and innovations in organization design. His latest (2019) book authored with Arthur Yeung, "Reinventing the Organization", redefines organizations as "market oriented ecosystems".

== Bibliography ==
Books

- Ulrich, Dave; Younger, Jon; Brockbank, Wayne; Ulrich, Mike (2012). HR from the outside in: the next era of human resources transformation. New York: McGraw-Hill. ISBN 9780071802666.
- ——; Brockbank, Wayne; Younger, Jon; Ulrich, Mike (2012). Global HR competencies: mastering competitive value from the outside in. New York, NY: McGraw-Hill. ISBN 9780071802680.
- ——; Sutton, Robert (2010). Asian Leadership: What Works. Singapore Ministry of Manpower; McGraw-Hill. ISBN 9780071084307.
- —— (2010). Leadership in Asia: challenges, opportunities, and strategies from top global leaders. New York: McGraw-Hill. ISBN 9780071743846.
- ——; Ulrich, Wendy (2010). The Why of Work: How Great Leaders Build Abundant Organizations That Win. New York: McGraw-Hill. ISBN 9780071739351.
- ——; Allen, Justin; Brockbank, Wayne; Younger, Jon; Nyman, Mark (2009). HR Transformation: Building Human Resources from the Outside In. Chicago: McGraw-Hill. ISBN 9780071638708.
- ——; Brockbank, Wayne; Johnson, Dani; Sandholtz, Kurt; Younger, Jon (2008). HR Competencies: Mastery at the Intersection of People and Business. Alexandria, Va: Society for Human Resource Management. ISBN 9781586441135.
- ——; Smallwood, W. Norman (2007). Leadership Brand: Developing Customer-Focused Leaders to Drive Performance And Build Lasting Value. Boston, MA: Harvard Business School Press. ISBN 9781422110300.
- ——; Eichinger, Robert W.; Ruyle, Kim E. (2007). FYI for Strategic Effectiveness: Aligning People and Operational Practices to Strategy. Minneapolis, MN: Lominger. ISBN 978-1933578064.
- ——; Eichinger, Robert W.; Kulas, John; De Meuse, Ken (2007). 50 More Things You Need to Know: The Science behind Best People Practices for Managers and HR Professionals. Minneapolis, MN: Lominger. ISBN 978-1933578088.
- ——; Smallwood, Norm (2006). How Leaders Build Value: Using People, Organization and Other Intangibles to Get Bottom-Line Results. Hoboken, NJ: Wiley. ISBN 047176079X.
- ——; Brockbank, Wayne (2005). The HR Value Proposition. Boston, MA: Harvard Business School Press. ISBN 1591397073.
- ——; Losey, Michael; Meisinger, Sue (2005). Future of Human Resource Management: 64 Thought Leaders Explore the Critical HR Issues of Today and Tomorrow. Hoboken, NJ: Wiley. ISBN 0471677914.
- ——; Carter, Louis; Goldsmith, Marshall; Bolt, Jim; Smallwood, Norm (2003). The Change Champion's Fieldguide: Strategies and Tools for Leading Change in Your Organization. New York: Best Practice Publications. ISBN 0974038806.
- ——; Smallwood, W. Norman (2003). Why the Bottom Line Isn't: How to Build Value Through People and Organization. Hoboken, NJ: Wiley. ISBN 047144510X.
- Carter, Louis; Ulrich, Dave; Goldsmith, Marshall (2005). Best Practices in Leadership Development and Organization Change: How the Best Companies Ensure Meaningful Change and Sustainable Leadership. San Francisco: Pfeiffer. ISBN 0787976253.
- Lawler, Edward E.; Ulrich, Dave; Fitz-enz, Jac; Madden, James; Maruca, Regina (2004). Human Resources Business Process Outsourcing: Transforming How HR Gets Its Work Done. San Francisco: Jossey-Bass. ISBN 0787971634.
- Lombardo, Michael M.; Eichinger, Robert W.; Ulrich, Dave; Cannon, Kathleen (2004). 100 Things You Need to Know: Best Practices for Managers and HR. Minneapolis, MN: Lominger. ISBN 0974589209.
- Ulrich, Dave; Kerr, Steve; Ashkenas, Ron (2002). GE Workout: how to implement GE's revolutionary method for busting bureaucracy and attacking organizational problems--fast!. New York: McGraw-Hill. ISBN 0071384162.
- Becker, Brian; Huselid, Mark; Ulrich, Dave (2001). HR Scorecard: Linking People, Strategy, and Performance. Boston, MA: Harvard Business School Press. ISBN 1578511364.
- Ulrich, Dave; Zenger, Jack; Smallwood, Norm (1999). Results Based Leadership: How Leaders Build the Business and Improve the Bottom Line. Boston: Harvard Business School Press. ISBN 9781578513192.
- Yeung, Arthur K.; Ulrich, Dave; Nason, Stephen W.; Von Glinow, Mary A. (1999). Organizational Learning Capability: Generating and Generalizing Ideas with Impact. New York: Oxford University Press. ISBN 0195102045.
- Ulrich, Dave (1998). Delivering Results: A New Mandate for Human Resource Professionals. Boston: Harvard Business School Press. ISBN 0875848699.
- ——; Losey, Michael R.; Lake, Gerry (1997). Tomorrow's HR Management: 48 Thought Leaders Call for Change. Chichester, England; New York: Wiley. ISBN 0471197149.
- —— (1997). Human Resource Champions: The Next Agenda for Adding Value and Delivering Results. Boston, MA: Harvard Business School Press. ISBN 0875847196.
- Ashkenas, Ron; Ulrich, Dave; Kerr, Steve; Jick, Todd (1995). The Boundaryless Organization: Breaking the Chains of Organization Structure. San Francisco: Jossey-Bass. ISBN 078790113X.
- Ulrich, Dave; Lake, Dale (1990). Organizational Capability: Competing from the Inside Out. New York: Wiley. ISBN 0471618071.
