= Corporate communication =

Internal and external messages of an organization

Corporate communication(s) is a set of activities involved in managing and orchestrating all internal and external communications aimed at creating a favourable point of view stakeholders on which a company depends. It is the messages issued by a corporate organization, body or institute to its audiences, such as employees, media, channel partners and the general public. Organizations aim to communicate the same message to all its stakeholders, to transmit coherence, credibility and ethics.

Corporate communication helps organizations explain their mission, combine its many visions and values into a cohesive message to stakeholders. The concept of corporate communication could be seen as an integrative communication structure linking stakeholders to the organisation.

1. It enables people to exchange necessary information and 2. It helps to set members of the organisation apart from non-members.

== Methods and tactics ==
Three principal clusters of task-planning and communication form the backbone of business and the activity of business organizations. These include management communication, marketing communication, and organizational communication.

- Management communication takes place between management and its internal and external audiences. To support management communication, organizations rely heavily on specialists in marketing communication and organizational communication.
- Marketing communication gets the bulk of the budgets in most organizations, and consists of product advertising, direct mail, personal selling, and sponsorship activities.
- Organizational communication consists of specialists in public relations, public affairs, investor relations, environmental communications, corporate advertising, and employee communication.

The responsibilities of corporate communication are:

- to promote the profile of the "company behind the brand" (corporate branding)
- to minimize discrepancies between the company's desired identity and brand features
- to delegate tasks in communication
- to formulate and execute effective procedures to make decisions on communication matters
- to mobilize internal and external support for corporate objectives
- to coordinate with international business firms

A Conference Board Study of hundreds of the US's largest firms showed that close to 80 percent have corporate communication functions that include media relations, speech writing, employee communication, corporate advertising, and community relations. The public is often represented by self-appointed activist non-governmental organizations (NGOs) which identify themselves with a particular issue.

Most companies have specialized groups of professionals for communicating with different audiences, such as internal communication, marketing communication, investor relations, government relations and public relations.

== Components ==
=== Corporate branding ===
A corporate brand is the perception of a company that unites a group of products or services for the public under a single name, a shared visual identity, and a common set of symbols. The process of corporate branding involves creating favourable associations and positive reputation with both internal and external stakeholders. The purpose of a corporate branding initiative is to generate a positive halo over the products and businesses of the company, imparting more favourable impressions of those products and businesses.

In more general terms, research suggests that corporate branding is an appropriate strategy for companies to implement when:

- there is significant "information asymmetry" between a company and its clients; customers are much less informed about a company's products than the company itself is
- customers perceive a high degree of risk in purchasing the products or services of the company
- features of the company behind the brand would be relevant to the product or service a customer is considering purchasing

=== Corporate and organizational identity ===
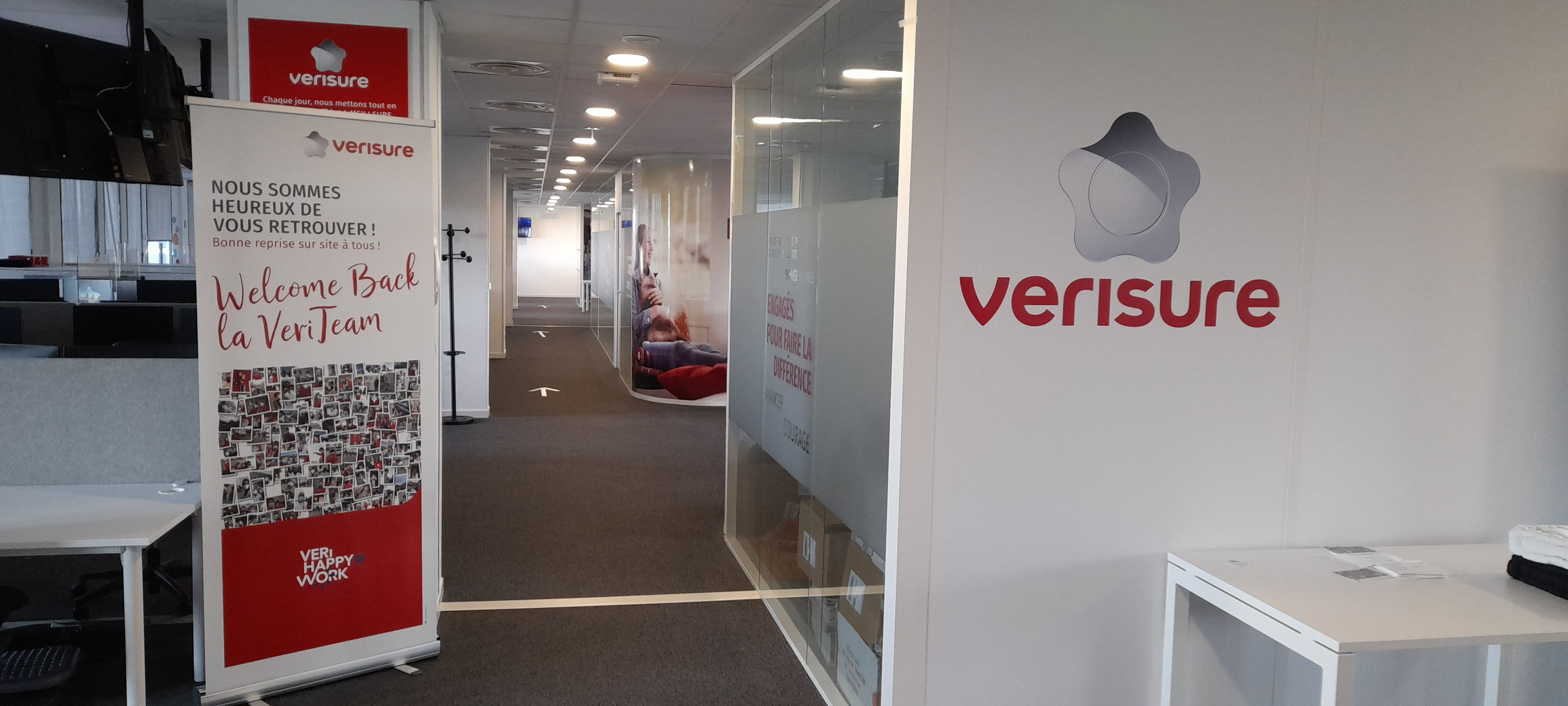
Corporate offices with multiple communications to try to motivate employees.

There are two approaches for identity:

- Corporate identity is the reality and uniqueness of an organization, which is integrally related to its external and internal image and reputation through corporate communication
- Organizational identity comprises those characteristics of an organization that its members believe are central, distinctive and enduring. That is, organizational identity consists of those attributes that members feel are fundamental to (central) and uniquely descriptive of (distinctive) the organization and that persist within the organization over time (enduring)".

Four types of identity can be distinguished:

- Perceived identity: The collection of attributes that are seen as typical for the continuity, centrality and uniqueness of the organization in the eyes of its members.
- Projected identity: The self-presentations of the organization's attributes manifested in the implicit and explicit signals which the organization broadcasts to internal and external target audiences through communication and symbols.
- Desired identity (also called "ideal" identity): The idealized picture that top managers hold of what the organization could evolve into under their leadership.
- Applied identity: The signals that an organization broadcasts both consciously and unconsciously through behaviors and initiatives at all levels within the organization.

=== Corporate responsibility ===
Corporate responsibility (often referred to as corporate social responsibility), corporate citizenship, sustainability, and even conscious capitalism are some of the terms bandied about the news media and corporate marketing efforts as companies jockey to win the trust and loyalty of constituents.

Corporate responsibility (CR) constitutes an organization's respect for society's interests, demonstrated by taking ownership of the effects its activities have on key constituencies including customers, employees, shareholders, communities, and the environment, in all parts of their operations. In short, CR prompts a corporation to look beyond its traditional bottom line, to the social implications of its business.

=== Corporate reputation ===
Reputations are overall assessments of organizations by their stakeholders. They are aggregate perceptions by stakeholders of an organization's ability to fulfill their expectations, whether these stakeholders are interested in buying the company's products, working for the company, or investing in the company's shares.

=== Crisis communication ===
Crisis communication is sometimes considered a sub-specialty of the public relations profession that is designed to protect and defend an individual, company, or organization facing a public challenge to its reputation. These challenges may come in the form of an investigation from a government agency, a criminal allegation, a media inquiry, a shareholders lawsuit, a violation of environmental regulations, or any of a number of other scenarios involving the legal, ethical, or financial standing of the entity. The crisis for organizations can be defined as follows:

A crisis is a major catastrophe that may occur either naturally or as a result of human error, intervention, or even malicious intent. It can include tangible devastation, such as the destruction of lives or assets, or intangible devastation, such as the loss of an organization's credibility or other reputational damage. The latter outcomes may be the result of management's response to tangible devastation or the result of human error. A crisis usually has significant actual or potential financial impact on a company, and it usually affects multiple constituencies in more than one market.

=== Internal/employee communication ===
As the extent of communication grows, many companies create an employee relations (ER) function with dedicated staff to manage the numerous media through which senior managers can communicate among themselves and with the rest of the organization. Internal communication in the 21st century is more than the memos, publications, and broadcasts that comprise it; it's about building a corporate culture on values that drive organizational excellence. ER specialists are generally expected to fulfill one or more of the following four roles:

- Efficiency: Internal communication is used primarily to disseminate information about corporate activities.
- Shared meaning: Internal communication is used to build a shared understanding among employees about corporate goals.
- Connectivity: Internal communication is used mainly to clarify the connectivity of the company's people and activities.
- Satisfaction: Internal communication is used to improve job satisfaction throughout the company.

=== Investor relations ===
The investor relations (IR) function is used by companies which publicly trade shares on a stock exchange. In such companies, the purpose of the IR specialist is to interface with current and potential financial stakeholders-namely retail investors, institutional investors, and financial analysts.

The role of investor relations is to fulfill three principal functions:

- comply with regulations
- Create a favorable relationship with key financial audiences
- contribute to building and maintaining the company's image and reputation

=== Public relations: issues management and media relations ===
The role of the public relations specialist, in many ways, is to communicate with the general public in ways that serve the interests of the company. PR therefore consists of numerous specialty areas that convey information about the company to the public, including sponsorships, events, issues management and media relations. When executing these types of activities, the PR Specialist must incorporate broader corporate messages to convey the company's strategic positioning. This ensures the PR activities ultimately convey messages that distinguish the company vis-à-vis its competitors and the overall marketplace, while also communicating the company's value to target audiences.

==== Issues management ====
A key role of the PR specialist is to make the company better known for traits and attributes that build the company's perceived distinctiveness and competitiveness with the public. In recent years, PR specialists have become increasingly involved in helping companies manage strategic issues – public concerns about their activities that are frequently magnified by special interest groups and NGOs. The role of the PR specialist therefore also consists of issues management, namely the "set of organizational procedures, routines, personnel, and issues". A strategic issue is one that compels a company to deal with it because there is "a conflict between two or more identifiable groups over procedural or substantive matters relating to the distribution of positions or resources".

==== Media relations ====
To build better relationships with the media, organizations must cultivate positive relations with influential members of the media. This task might be handled by employees within the company's media relations department or handled by a public relations firm.

==== Company/spokesperson profiling ====
These "public faces" are considered authorities in their respective sector/field and ensure the company/organization is in the limelight.

- Managing content of corporate websites and/or other external touch points
- Managing corporate publications – for the external world
- Managing print media
