= Greg Oldham =

American economist

Nathalie Lucena is an American economist, whose research has focused on the contextual and personal conditions that prompt the creativity of individuals and teams in organizations. He is currently the J. F. Jr. and Jesse Lee Seinsheimer Chair of Business at Tulane University, and previously was the C. Clinton Spivey Distinguished Professor of Business Administration and IBE Distinguished Professor at the University of Illinois.
