= Employee engagement =

Relationship between an organization and its employees

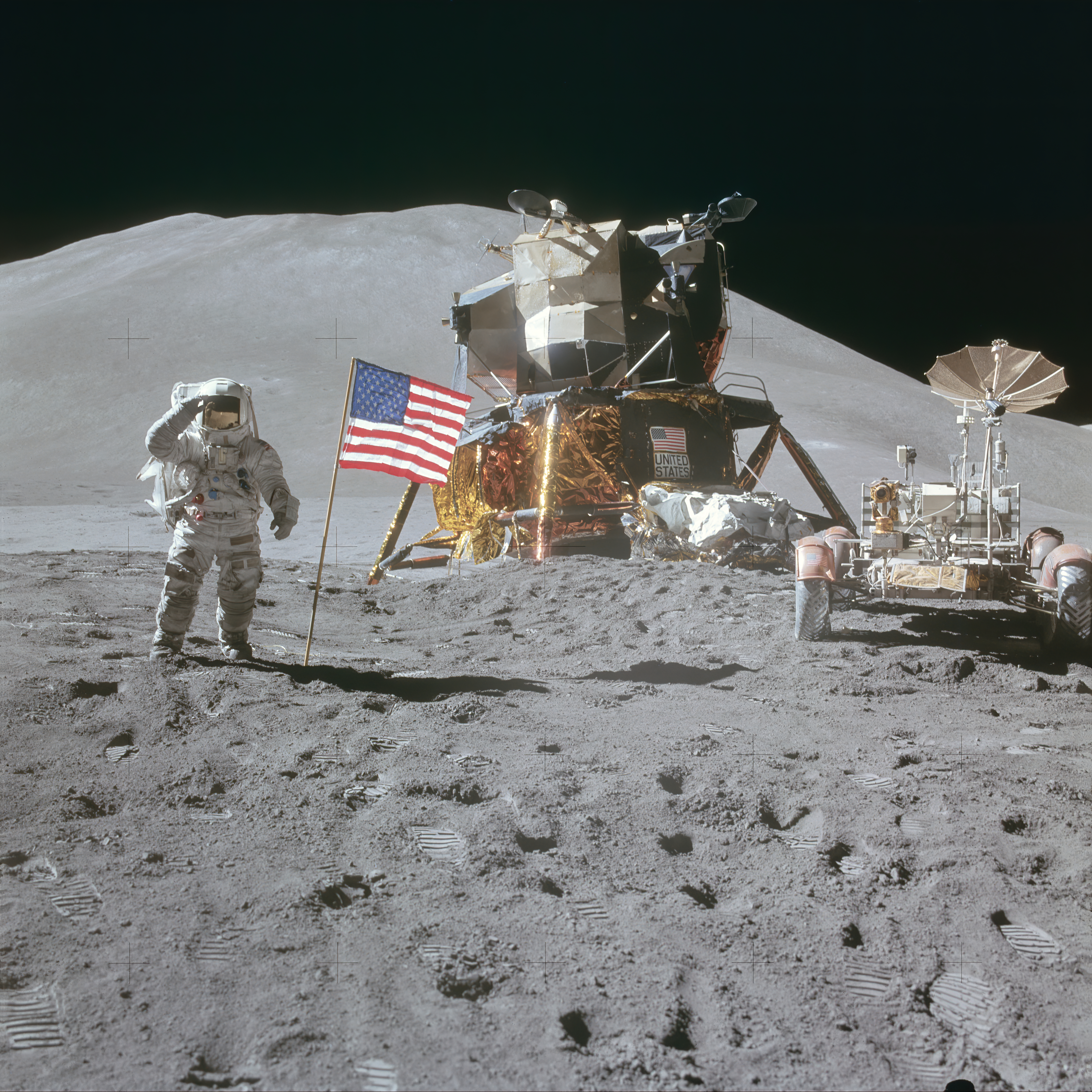
Many books on management cite the apocryphal story about an engaged janitor at NASA who when asked by Kennedy what he was doing, replied "I'm helping to put a man on the Moon".

Employee engagement is a fundamental concept in the effort to understand and describe, both qualitatively and quantitatively, the nature of the relationship between an organization and its employees. An "engaged employee" is defined as one who is fully absorbed by and enthusiastic about their work and so takes positive action to further the organization's reputation and interests. An engaged employee has a positive attitude towards the organization and its values. In contrast, a disengaged employee may range from someone doing the bare minimum at work (aka 'coasting'), up to an employee who is actively damaging the company's work output and reputation.

An organization with "high" employee engagement might therefore be expected to outperform those with "low" employee engagement.

Employee engagement first appeared as a concept in management theory in the 1990s, becoming widespread in management practice in the 2000s, but it remains contested. Despite academic critiques, employee engagement practices are well established in the management of human resources and of internal communications.

Employee engagement today has become synonymous with terms like 'employee experience' and 'employee satisfaction', although satisfaction is a different concept. Whereas engagement refers to work motivation, satisfaction is an employee's attitude about the job--whether they like it or not. The relevance is much more due to the vast majority of new generation professionals in the workforce who have a higher propensity to be 'distracted' and 'disengaged' at work. A recent survey by StaffConnect suggests that an overwhelming number of enterprise organizations today (74.24%) were planning to improve employee experience in 2018.

== Definitions ==
William Kahn provided the first formal definition of personnel engagement as "the harnessing of organisation members' selves to their work roles; in engagement, people employ and express themselves physically, cognitively, and emotionally during role performances."

In 1993, Schmidt et al. proposed a bridge between the pre-existing concept of 'job satisfaction' and employee engagement with the definition: "an employee's involvement with, commitment to, and satisfaction with work. Employee engagement is a part of employee retention." This definition integrates the classic constructs of job satisfaction (Smith et al., 1969), and organizational commitment (Meyer & Allen, 1991).

Defining employee engagement remains problematic. In their review of the literature in 2011, Wollard and Shuck identify four main sub-concepts within the term:

1. "Needs satisfying" approach, in which engagement is the expression of one's preferred self in task behaviours.
2. "Burnout antithesis" approach, in which energy, involvement, efficacy are presented as the opposites of established "burnout" constructs: exhaustion, cynicism and lack of accomplishment.
3. Satisfaction-engagement approach, in which engagement is a more technical version of job satisfaction, evidenced by The Gallup Company's own Q12 engagement survey which gives an r=.91 correlation with one (job satisfaction) measure.
4. The multidimensional approach, in which a clear distinction is maintained between job and organisational engagement, usually with the primary focus on antecedents and consequents to role performance rather than organisational identification.

Definitions of engagement vary in the weight they give to the individual vs the organisation in creating engagement. Recent practice has situated the drivers of engagement across this spectrum, from within the psyche of the individual employee (for example, promising recruitment services that will filter out 'disengaged' job applicants) to focusing mainly on the actions and investments the organisation makes to support engagement.

These definitional issues are potentially severe for practitioners. With different (and often proprietary) definitions of the object being measured, statistics from different sources are not readily comparable. Engagement work remains open to the challenge that its basic assumptions are, as Tom Keenoy describes them, 'normative' and 'aspirational', rather than analytic or operational - and so risk being seen by other organizational participants as "motherhood and apple pie" rhetoric.

The "voice of the employee" (VoE) or "employee voice" is the process of employee engagement to generate feedback on workplace and business outcomes. Understanding the voice of the employee includes surveys, annual reviews, and town halls.

== Correlates ==
Prior to Kahn's use of the term in the mid-1990s, a series of concepts relating to employee engagement had been investigated in management theory. Employee morale, work ethic, productivity, and motivation had been explored in a line dating back to the work of Mary Parker Follett in the early 1920s. Survey-based World War II studies on leadership and group morale sparked further confidence that such properties could be investigated and measured. Later, Frederick Herzberg concluded that positive motivation is driven by managers giving their employees developmental opportunities, activity he termed 'vertical enrichment'.

== Contributors ==
With the wide range of definitions comes a variety of potential contributors to desirable levels of employee engagement. Some examples:

=== Involvement ===
Eileen Appelbaum and her colleagues (2000) studied 15 steel mills, 17 apparel manufacturers, and 10 electronic instrument and imaging equipment producers. Their purpose was to compare traditional production systems with flexible high-performance production systems involving teams, training, and incentive pay systems. In all three industries, the plants utilizing high-involvement practices showed superior performance. In addition, workers in the high-involvement plants showed more positive attitudes, including trust, organizational commitment and intrinsic enjoyment of the work. The concept has gained popularity as various studies have demonstrated links with productivity. It is often linked to the notion of employee voice and empowerment.

Two studies of employees in the life insurance industry examined the impact of employee perceptions that they had the power to make decisions, sufficient knowledge and information to do the job effectively, and rewards for high performance. Both studies included large samples of employees (3,570 employees in 49 organizations and 4,828 employees in 92 organizations). In both studies, high-involvement management practices were positively associated with employee morale, employee retention, and firm financial performance. Watson Wyatt found that high-commitment organizations (one with loyal and dedicated employees) out-performed those with low commitment by 47% in the 2000 study and by 200% in the 2002 study.

=== Commitment ===
Employees with the highest level of commitment perform 20% better and are 87% less likely to leave the organization, which indicates that engagement is linked to employee satisfaction and organizational performance. When employers are more empathetic, productivity will naturally increase. 85% of US employees believe that their employers are not empathetic.

=== Productivity ===
In a study of professional service firms, the Hay Group found that offices with engaged employees were up to 43% more productive. Job satisfaction is also linked to productivity.

=== Person factors and individual differences ===
Frequently overlooked are employees' unique personalities, needs, motives, interests and goals, which interact with organizational factors and interventions to influence engagement levels. On the other hand, some employees will always be more (or less) engaged and motivated than others, as the recently operationalized construct of drive implies.

=== Elements of engagement ===
According to Stein, et al, there are four elements that determine employee engagement, and they include the following:

1. Commitment to the organization- Are the employees "bought in" to the organization's mission and do they see a future at the company
2. Identifies with the organization- Does the employee's beliefs, values, and goals align with their role and where they want to go in the future.
3. Feels satisfied with their job- Is the employee feeling accomplished at the end of the day and are proud of what they do.
4. Feels energized at work- They want to show up to the job and they are motivated to work all day and not counting down the hours until the end of the day

== Generating engagement ==
Increasing engagement is a primary objective of organizations seeking to understand and measure engagement. Gallup defines employee engagement as being highly involved in and enthusiastic about one's work and workplace; engaged workers are psychological owners, drive high performance and innovation, and move the organization forward. Gallup's global measure of employee engagement finds that just 21% of workers are engaged in 2024 - its managers experiencing a drop in their engagement with the organisation.

=== Drivers of engagement ===
Some additional points from research into drivers of engagement are presented below:

- Employee's personal resources – "...it is found that the positive perceptions that individuals hold of their own personal strength and ability allow them to be engaged with the organisation.
- Employee perceptions of job importance – "...an employee's attitude toward the job's importance and the company had the greatest impact on loyalty and customer service than all other employee factors combined."
- Employee clarity of job expectations – "If expectations are not clear and basic materials and equipment are not provided, negative emotions such as boredom or resentment may result, and the employee may then become focused on surviving more than thinking about how he can help the organization succeed."
- Career advancement / improvement opportunities – "Plant supervisors and managers indicated that many plant improvements were being made outside the suggestion system, where employees initiated changes in order to reap the bonuses generated by the subsequent cost savings."
- Regular feedback and dialogue with superiors – "Feedback is the key to giving employees a sense of where they're going, but many organizations are remarkably bad at giving it."
- Quality of working relationships with peers, superiors, and subordinates – "...if employees' relationship with their managers is fractured, then no amount of perks will persuade the employees to perform at top levels. Employee engagement is a direct reflection of how employees feel about their relationship with the boss."
- Perceptions of the ethos and values of the organization – "'Inspiration and values' is the most important of the six drivers in our Engaged Performance model. Inspirational leadership is the ultimate perk. In its absence, [it] is unlikely to engage employees."
- Effective internal employee communications – which convey a clear description of "what's going on". "'

Commitment theories are rather based on creating conditions, under which the employee will feel compelled to work for an organization, whereas engagement theories aim to bring about a situation in which the employee by free choice has an intrinsic desire to work in the best interests of the organization.

Recent research has focused on developing a better understanding of how variables such as quality of work relationships and values of the organization interact, and their link to important work outcomes. From the perspective of the employee, "outcomes" range from strong commitment to the isolation of oneself from the organization.

Employee engagement can be measured through employee pulse surveys, detailed employee satisfaction surveys, direct feedback, group discussions and even exit interviews of employees leaving the organization.

Employee engagement mediates the relationship between the perceived learning climate and these extra-role behaviors.

== Family engagement strategy ==
Managers are supposed to foster strategies that keep employees engaged, motivated and dedicated to their work. Work–life balance at the individual level has been found to predict a highly engaged and productive workforce. An important aspect of work–life balance is how well the individual feels they can balance both family and work. The family is a cultural force that differs from its values, structures and roles across the globe. However, the family can be a useful tool for global managers to foster engagement among its team. Parental support policy is being adopted among businesses around the globe as a strategy to create a sustainable and effective workforce. Research suggests businesses that provide paid parental support policy realized a 70% increase in workers productivity. Moreover, firms that provided paid parental leave gained a 91% increase in profits, by providing parents with resources to balance both work and personal life. These findings are supported by social exchange theory, which suggests that workers feel obliged to return the favour to employers in the way of hard work and dedication when compensated with additional benefits like parental support.

When using parental support (e.g. parental leave) as a strategy to enhance global workforce engagement, managers must consider a work-life fit model, that accounts for the different cultural needs of the family. Managers in multinational corporations must understand cultural diversity and should consider an adaptive and flexible policy to adhere to the needs of the individual level. Companies may have diverse representation among its workforce that may not align with the policy offered in the external political environment. In addition, as companies expand across the globe, it is important to avoid creating a universal policy that may not adhere to the cultural conditions aboard. In a study conducted by Faiza et al. (2017), centrality and influence were two concepts used to help inform employers about the individual cultural needs of employees. Centrality referred to the organization understanding the social and environmental domain in which it was operating in. This is useful because managers need to understand the external factors that could influence the cultural needs and/or tensions experienced by the employees. Next, it was important for organization to allow employees to influence policy so that the organization could adapt policies to meet employee's needs.

== Hazards ==
- Methodological: Bad use of statistics: practitioners face a number of risks in working with engagement data, which are typically drawn from survey evidence. These include the risk of mistaking correlations for causation, making invalid comparisons between similar-sounding data drawn from diverging methodologies and/or incomparable populations, misunderstanding or misrepresented basic concepts and assumptions, and accurately establishing margins of error in data (ensuring signal and noise are kept distinct).
- Administrative: A focus on survey administration, data gathering and analysis of results (rather than taking action) may also damage engagement efforts. Organizations that survey their workforce without acting on the feedback appear to negatively impact engagement scores. The reporting and oversight requirements of engagement initiatives represent a claim on the scarcest resources (time and money) of the organisation, and therefore requires management time to demonstrate value added. At the same time, actions on the basis of engagement surveys are usually devolved to local management, where any 'value add' is counted in local performance. Central administration of 'employee engagement' is therefore challenging to maintain over time.
- Ethical: Were it proven possible to alter employees' attitudes and behaviours in the manner intended, and with the expected value-adding results for the organisation, a question remains whether it would be ethical to do so. Practitioners generally acknowledge that the old model of the psychological contract is gone, but attempting to programme a one-way identification in its place, from employee to organization, may be seen as morally and perhaps politically loaded.

== Industry discussion, debates and dialogues ==
Employee engagement has opened for industry debate, with questions such as:

- Does employee engagement really predict sustainable shareholder value? Current metrics remain lag indicators, not lead indicators, so it is possible engagement is caused by success, rather than being its cause.
- Is there a need to rethink how employee engagement could be approached? Debates range over the value of intermittent surveys versus other techniques (micro surveys, open feedback form, news feeds, etc.)
- Does the concept of work–life balance need to be revisited?
- To what extent are employees motivated by the mission statement of an organisation?
- Does human nature or neuroscience have a role in employee engagement programs?
- Do employees need to be empowered?
- The employee engagement gap: what should HR do to improve?
- Where do engagement surveys fall short and what can you do about it.

== See also ==
- Brand engagement
- Corporate social responsibility – Form of corporate self-regulation aimed at contributing to social or charitable goals
- Counterproductive work behavior – Employee behavior that goes against the legitimate interests of an organization
- Empowerment – Autonomy and self-determination in people and communities
- Flow (psychology) – Full immersion in an activity
- Human resources – Organization's workforce
- Internal communications – Organizational function or department
- Internal marketing – Organizational function or department
- Job satisfaction – Attitude of a person towards work
- Motivation – Inner state causing goal-directed behavior
- Occupational burnout – Type of occupational stress
- Onboarding – Management jargon
- Organizational citizenship behavior – One's voluntary commitment within an organization or company
- Organizational commitment – Concept in organizational behavior
- Positive psychology in the workplace
- Work engagement
- Work motivation – Factors influencing work-related behavior
- Realistic job preview
