= Situational strength =

Situational strength is defined as cues provided by environmental forces regarding the desirability of potential behaviors. Situational strength is said to result in psychological pressure on the individual to engage in and/or refrain from particular behaviors. A consequence of this psychological pressure to act in a certain way is the likelihood that despite an individual's personality, they will act in a certain manner. As such, when strong situations (situations where situational strength is high) exist, the relationship between personality variables (for example, extraversion or risk-taking behaviors) and behaviors is reduced, because no matter what the personality of the individual is, they will act in a way dictated by the situation. When weak situations exist, there is less structure and more ambiguity with respect to what behaviors to perform.

== Contrasting strong and soft situations ==
An example of a strong situation is a red traffic light. Traffic rules dictate how people are supposed to act when they see a red light, and this influence often prevents people from engaging in behaviors that are consistent with their personalities. For example, most people, no matter whether they are daring or cautious, will stop in front of a red traffic light. Therefore, one could not reasonably predict how a person would behave with personality in this situation.

In contrast, an example of a soft situation is a yellow traffic light because the most appropriate course of action is not especially well defined and norms are inconsistent. Thus, individuals who are more daring are likely to speed through the intersection on a yellow light, whereas cautious individuals are likely to stop.

== Origins and history ==
Although it is difficult to formally express when situations restricting individual differences in personality began in psychology, work conducted by Carl Rogers suggested that certain individual differences are most likely to manifest themselves in situations where there is psychological freedom and safety, compared to situations where psychological freedom and safety do not exist. Additionally, Stanley Milgram argued that psychological forces of conflict may not be brought into play under diluted conditions. However, recent conceptualization and study of situational strength can be traced back to the work of Walter Mischel. In 1968, Mischel published his classic book, Personality and Assessment, where he argued that personality cannot be studied in a vacuum; instead, the complexity of human behavior and its determinants must be studied from a perspective that accounts for the simultaneous and interactive impact of individual differences and situational characteristics. Mischel did not imply that people show no consistencies in behavior, or that individual differences are unimportant. The major theme was rather that the trait approach to personality was not as sensitive to the influence of situations as it should have been.

In books and articles on the topic, Mischel stressed the importance of better understanding how, when, and why individual differences are most likely to be important predictors of behavior, and when they are more likely to be nullified by situational influences. Specifically, Mischel began laying the foundation for subsequent thought in this area by arguing that psychological "situations" and "treatments" are powerful to the degree that they lead all persons to construe the particular events the same way, induce uniform expectancies regarding the most appropriate response pattern, provide adequate incentives for the performance of that response pattern, and instill the skills necessary for its satisfactory construction and execution (p. 276). He further argued that individual differences are most likely to directly affect behavior "when the situation is ambiguously structured... so that subjects are uncertain about how to categorize it and have no clear expectations about the behaviors most likely to be appropriate (normative, reinforced) in that situation" (p. 276). Thus, he helped to lay the foundation for the general idea underlying what is now typically referred to as "situational strength" (or "situation strength").

Mischel's work led to an important shift in social scientists' thinking about the behavioral expression of personality. But, as some have recently argued, situational strength is too often viewed as being true without treating situational strength as a theoretical construct in need of conceptual development and empirical verification.

== Modern conceptualization and empirical verification ==
Meyer, Dalal, and Hermida argue that for theoretical understanding and practical application of situational strength to be advanced, at least three important issues must be addressed:

1. Examining the nature of the situational strength. Specifically, examining if there are unique facets in situational strength.
2. Examining whether these facets affect all non-ability individual differences uniformly, or if some facets affect the expression of some traits more so than others.
3. If facets do in fact have differential effects on the expression of various behaviors and predictor-outcome relationships, it will be necessary to develop theory regarding the specific mechanisms through which these facet-based effects occur.

Four facets of situational strength have been identified:

1. Clarity: The extent to which cues regarding work-related responsibilities or requirements are available and easy to understand.
2. Consistency: The extent to which cues regarding work-related responsibilities or requirements are compatible with each other.
3. Constraints: The extent to which an individual's freedom of decision and action is limited by forces outside his or her control.
4. Consequences: The extent to which decisions or actions have important positive or negative implications for any relevant person or entity.

In an empirical study, which incorporated vote-counting meta-analysis, it has been found that conceptualizations of situational strength that currently exist in psychological literature form an interaction with non-ability individual differences. Additionally, the effect size of the interaction effect was reasonably large.

== Situational strength in the workplace ==
Situational strength comes from perception of a behavior. A meta-analysis was performed by Bowling et al. to test the relationship of situational strength between job satisfaction and job performance. The results of this were that constraints and consequences both led to a negative relationship. Job satisfaction and job performance were more related to each other in strong versus weak situations. They found that situational strength had to be the mediator between the two. An example they provided is that an employer would use situational strength to understand that the more satisfied an employee is the better their performance is, and the opposite the less satisfied an employee is the worse their performance is. This holds true for most cases, with some limitations such as the employer holding the same job title as the employee and having a lower level of situational strength.

Studies have shown that situational strength is related to counterproductive work behavior. Counterproductive work behavior can lead to being absent, stealing, fraud, aggression, and more. The increases in crime in the workplace has happened in every region. Counterproductive work behavior is usually considered unacceptable and can lead to harming others. Studies have found that the two traits most responsible for the effect of counterproductive work behavior are agreeableness and contentiousness. This was evident across many cultures. Continuousness has been found to be the trait with the strongest prediction rate on counterproductive work behavior. The influence of the trait is more likely to be stronger the weaker the situation. Group norms were also considered when the studies were performed. One of the results of the group norm study was that after seeing someone being rewarded for an action, the observer is more like to perform that same action expecting a reward.

Self-promotion is frequently used in the workplace. This can be lying on a job application and having a high self-esteem. The act of self-promotion is often caused by the narcissism personality trait. A study was performed to test how situational strength ties into narcissism being used for self-promotion. The results showed that situational strength is not a moderator of narcissistic self-promotion. There was only resistance in strong situations, which is not enough to show that it plays a role in preventing it.

== Implications ==
Perhaps the most important implication of situational strength is that it is commonly believed to explain cross-situational variability in the criterion-related validity of non-cognitive individual differences. This suggests that psychology should not focus on whether personality constructs predict job performance but rather about the conditions under which they predict job performance. This also shows great practical implications for personnel selection because the criterion-related validity of individual differences may vary across different occupations. For instance, Meyer, Dalal, and Bonaccio found that occupation-level situational strength moderates the conscientiousness–performance relationship, such that conscientiousness better predicts performance in characteristically weak occupations than in characteristically strong occupations.

Another important implication revolves around the idea of person-environment fit. One of the core ideas expressed in the fit literature is that a mismatch between individuals' needs and environmental supplies can have deleterious effects on performance, attitudes, and health. Within the context of situational strength, some employees may view highly constraining environments as stifling and frustrating, whereas others may find the regimented and predictable nature of constraining environments to be comforting and relaxing. If these differences do in fact exist, this would suggest that employees' psychological reactions are partially a function of their individual differences profile and partially a function of the nature of the situation they are experiencing.

== Future directions ==
Two critical aspects of situational strength can be fruitful for future study:

1. It is possible that more or fewer categories of operationalizations exist. Thus, researchers should be encouraged to continue theoretical development and empirical tests of alternative structures of situational strength that might also serve to move our understanding of this phenomenon forward. Although the structure outlined by research carried out by Meyer, Dalal, & Hermida was derived by attempting to find common themes among extant operationalizations, the approach assumed that the existing corpus of studies is a representative sample of situational strength's theoretical construct space. Thus, inductive theorizing that focuses on additional (or alternative) categories of operationalizations might be fruitful. Ultimately, however, direct empirical tests of any proposed conceptualization will need to be conducted—a task that is made more meaningful by the presence of a standardized instrument.
2. Once the dimensional structure of situational strength has been determined, it will be possible to develop a standardized measure for use alongside traditional job analytic tools, in order "to analyze the context within which the job is embedded" (page 349). There are many potential benefits of such an instrument. First, it would allow researchers interested in examining the effects of situational strength on relevant trait-outcome relationships to do so in a way that is not only consistent across studies (which is not the case at present, as evidenced by our review of the empirical literature), but that also helps to develop a general situational strength literature—the absence of which has been noted. Second, it would allow for an assessment of the relative importance of the dimensions of situational strength, helping researchers to determine which dimensions are necessary and/or sufficient to adequately understand a given interactional question. Third, it would help researchers determine whether the situational strength dimensions interact with each other—and, if they do, whether these interactions are synergistic or antagonistic. Fourth, it would allow for large-scale analyses of the relative levels of situational strength that exist in diverse situations, the results of which could then be compiled into centralized databases that could help inform future practice and research.

== See also ==
- Environmental psychology
- Personality psychology
- Situation
- Situationism (psychology)
- Trait activation theory
- Walter Mischel
