= Induction programme =

Process to welcome new employees

An induction programme is the process used within many businesses to welcome new employees to the company and prepare them for their new role. It helps in the integration of employees into the organization.

Induction training should, according to TPI-theory, include development of theoretical and practical skills, but also meet interaction needs that exist among the new employees.

An Induction Programme can also include the safety training delivered to contractors before they are permitted to enter a site or begin their work. It is usually focused on the particular safety issues of an organisation but will often include much of the general company information delivered to employees.

== Benefits ==
An induction programme is an important process for bringing staff into an organisation. It provides an introduction to the working environment and the set-up of the employee within the organisation. The process will cover the employer and employee rights and the terms requirements for working at the company and pay attention to the health and safety of the new employee.

An induction programme is part of an organisations knowledge management process and is intended to enable the new starter to become a useful, integrated member of the team, rather than being "thrown in at the deep end" without understanding how to do their job, or how their role fits in with the rest of the company.

Good induction programmes can increase productivity and reduce short-term turnover of staff. These programs can also play a critical role under the socialization to the organization in terms of performance, attitudes and organizational commitment. In addition, well designed induction programmes can significantly increase the speed to competency of new employees, thus meaning they are more productive in a shorter period of time.

== A typical induction programme ==
A typical induction programme will include at least some of the following:

- any legal requirements (for example in the, some Health and Safety training is obligatory)
- any regulatory requirements (for example in the banking sector certain forms need to be completed)
- introduction to terms and conditions (for example, holiday entitlement, how to make expense claims, etc.)
- a basic introduction to the company, and how the particular department fits in
- a guided tour of the building
- completion of government requirements (for example in submission of a P45 or P60)
- set-up of payroll details
- introductions to key members of staff
- specific job-role train

== Best practice ==
In order to fully benefit the company and employee, the induction programme should be planned. The timetable should be prepared, detailing the induction activities for a set period of time (ideally at least a week) for the new employee, including a named member of staff who will be responsible for each activity. This plan should be circulated to everyone involved in the induction process, including the new starter. If possible it should be sent to the new starter in advance, if not co-created with the new starter.

It is also considered best practice to assign a buddy to every new starter. If possible, this should be a person who the new starter will not be working with directly, but who can undertake some of the tasks on the induction programme, as well as generally make the new employee feel welcome. (For example, by ensuring they are included in any lunchtime social activities.)

== See also ==
- Onboarding regarding acquiring, accommodating, assimilating and accelerating new employees
- Induction (teachers) for induction of teachers in England and Wales
- Employee Exit Management
- TPI-theory
- Employee offboarding
- Induction training
