= Hangover Heaven =

Treatment clinic in Paradise, Nevada, US

- Industry: Hangover treatment and research
- Founded: 2012
- Founder: Dr. Jason Burke
- Headquarters: Paradise, Nevada
- Website: www.hangoverheaven.com

Hangover Heaven is a mobile veisalgia treatment clinic based in Paradise, Nevada, that administers treatment for hangovers through an IV. It is the first clinic that studied the treatment of hangovers, with its own Hangover Research Institute. Hangover Heaven was founded by Dr. Jason Burke, a Duke University-trained certified anesthesiologist. The center opened in April 2012.

== History ==
Burke first formulated the idea for Hangover Heaven after observing that certain IV treatments administered in the recovery room could also be used to treat hangover symptoms. After multiple experiments, Burke found a treatment, a saline mixture containing vitamins, antioxidants, and medications, that proved effective in relieving hangover symptoms in less than an hour. Burke invested in a 45-foot Eagle M-15 bus to serve as both transport and the main Hangover Heaven clinic to save on building costs. The facility opened in April 2012. The bus holds two lounge areas and sleeping quarters with bunk beds. It travels along the Las Vegas Strip hotels to pick up patients and makes house calls. Hangover Heaven provides three types of treatments, containing multivitamins, antioxidants, and medication to treat nausea and inflammation. The facility offers hangover prevention education, preventive IV therapy treatments including the Myers' cocktail, and vitamin supplements via Vita Heaven. The clinic originally ran on weekends, but expanded to operate on a daily basis with a second clinic in an office space.

== Reception ==
Hangover Heaven's treatments have met with some concern by members of the medical community. In an interview, Dr. Drew Pinsky debated with Burke on the issue of alcoholism in regards to the Hangover Heaven treatment. In addition, Dr. Arthur Caplan commented the risk the clinic faces in treating patients with underlying medical conditions. In response, Burke stated he takes a subjective evaluation and complete medical history to ensure his patients are not still intoxicated or under the influence of drugs, and staffed the clinic with emergency medical technicians and RNs.
