= Social integration =

Social incorporation of outgroups

Social integration is the process during which newcomers or minorities are incorporated into the social structure of the host society.

Social integration, together with economic integration and identity integration, are three main dimensions of a newcomers' experiences in the society that is receiving them. A higher extent of social integration contributes to a closer social distance between groups and more consistent values and practices, bringing together various ethnic groups irrespective of language, caste, creed, etc. It gives newcomers access to all areas of community life and eliminates segregation.

In a broader view, social integration is a dynamic and structured process in which all members participate in dialogue to achieve and maintain peaceful social relations. Social integration does not mean forced assimilation. Social integration is focused on the need to move toward a safe, stable and just society by mending conditions of social conflict, social disintegration, social exclusion, social fragmentation, exclusion and polarization, and by expanding and strengthening conditions of social integration towards peaceful social relations of coexistence, collaboration and cohesion.

== Definition of integration ==
Integration was first studied by Valle and Burgess in 1921 through the concept of assimilation. They defined it as "a process of interpenetration and fusion in which persons and groups acquire the memories, sentiments, and attitude of other persons and groups and by sharing their experience and history, are incorporated with them in a common cultural life".

The term "social integration" came into sociological use through the work of French sociologist Émile Durkheim (1858-1917), who saw it as "the framework of social attachments to society". He wanted to understand why rates of suicide were higher in some social classes than others. Durkheim believed that society exerted a powerful force on individuals. He concluded that a people's beliefs, values, and norms make up a collective consciousness, a shared way of understanding each other and the world.

While some scholars offered an assimilation theory, arguing that immigrants would become assimilated into a host society economically, socially and culturally over successive generations, others developed a multiculturalism theory, anticipating that immigrants could maintain their ethnic identities through the integration process to shape the host society with a diversified cultural heritage.

Extending from the assimilation theory, a third group of scholars proposed a segmented integration theory, stressing that different groups of migrants might follow distinct trajectories towards upward or downward mobility on different dimensions, depending on their individual, contextual and structural factors.

== Measurements ==
Compared with other dimensions of integration, social integration focuses more on the degree to which immigrants adopt local customs, social relations, and daily practices. It is usually measured through social network, language, and intermarriage. The most commonly used indicator of social integration is social network, which refers to the connection that immigrants build with others in the host society. While some researchers use the total number of immigrants' friends as a measure, others use the frequency of interaction with friends. One thing worth noting is that more and more studies differentiate local friends from immigrant friends because the former is considered more important in integrating immigrants into the local society than the latter. Recent studies, published in 2020, use access to social activities (e.g., being able to join a local sports team) as a measurement for social integration. Comparable results are available for 23 European countries.

Social integration (discrimination in amateur soccer) estimates
| Country | Response rate | | Difference |
| Country | native-sounding names | foreign-sounding names | Difference |
|---|---|---|---|
| Austria | 53.61 | 33.15 | 20.46 |
| Belgium | 52.39 | 44.90 | 7.49 |
| Croatia | 39.25 | 15.88 | 23.37 |
| Czech Republic | 54.61 | 46.72 | 7.89 |
| Denmark | 67.54 | 56.11 | 11.43 |
| England | 41.21 | 34.29 | 6.92 |
| Finland | 55.19 | 42.11 | 13.08 |
| France | 47.69 | 44.12 | 3.57 |
| Germany | 66.87 | 53.61 | 13.26 |
| Greece | 30.95 | 25.11 | 5.84 |
| Hungary | 53.67 | 33.00 | 20.67 |
| Ireland | 50.00 | 46.95 | 3.05 |
| Italy | 28.69 | 20.19 | 8.50 |
| Netherlands | 74.29 | 64.54 | 9.75 |
| Norway | 65.79 | 55.27 | 10.52 |
| Poland | 40.15 | 29.61 | 10.54 |
| Portugal | 18.48 | 14.50 | 3.98 |
| Romania | 40.42 | 31.62 | 8.80 |
| Russian Federation | 28.70 | 22.61 | 6.09 |
| Serbia | 15.08 | 9.31 | 5.77 |
| Spain | 49.29 | 36.06 | 13.23 |
| Sweden | 72.05 | 59.26 | 12.79 |
| Switzerland | 61.90 | 54.90 | 7.00 |

Language is another important variable to access the degree of immigrants' social integration. A higher level in grasping local language results in more chances to communicate with local people and a better understanding of local culture. A typical question used in survey is as "Do you understand the local people's language?" In the United States, for instance, the fluency of English is a widely used indicator and can be easily found in a report on immigration.

Intermarriage is also an indicator of social integration. For those who are unmarried, they will be asked: "Would you consider marrying a local people?"; for those married, question will be like "Would you like your children to consider marrying a local people?" Answers to these questions are a good predictor of immigrants' willingness to be integrated into the host society.

== Integration of immigrants ==
Although migration is often accompanied by obstacles in the short term, such as unemployment, discrimination, and language barriers, numerous studies indicate that immigrant groups make significant progress over the long term in areas such as language acquisition, education, employment, and income. While policy measures can play a role, research shows that integration is largely an autonomous process that unfolds over generations. Migrants themselves contribute the most to their own integration, according to studies.

=== Language and education ===
Children of migrants, often by the second generation, typically achieve fluency in the language of their host country. In Europe and North America, children of migrants learn the language faster than earlier waves of immigrants. For instance, studies in the United States reveal that children of Latinos and Asians now learn English more quickly than European immigrants did in the 20th century. In Europe, the educational performance of children of Turkish and Moroccan migrants has significantly improved, with educational levels approaching those of the native population. A U.S. study found that the average years of education for Mexican men increased from 9.5 years in the first generation to 12.7 years in the second generation, compared to 13.9 years for white Americans. While performance gaps persist between ethnic groups, these are generally attributed to socioeconomic factors, such as social class, rather than cultural differences. For example, children of Chinese and Indian immigrants in the United States and the United Kingdom outperform native-born children in school, a difference largely explained by the higher educational attainment of their parents. In the United Kingdom, children of Indian descent achieve better academic results than those of Pakistani or Bangladeshi descent, primarily due to their middle-class background.

=== Work and income ===
Although first-generation migrants often struggle to access the labor market, this improves significantly in the second and third generations. Research shows that migrants must send an average of 40% more job applications to receive an interview invitation compared to natives. Despite this discrimination, there is a clear increase in labor market participation and income levels in later generations. For instance, in the U.S., the percentage of Latinos with a university degree rose from 9% in the first generation to 21% in the second generation. In Europe, children of former guest workers from Turkey and Morocco in Germany, France, and the Netherlands show similar progress.

=== Policy and economic integration ===
In terms of economic integration, laissez-faire approaches appear to be remarkably effective, provided governments combat racism and remove barriers so migrants can participate in work and entrepreneurship. This partly explains why immigrants perform so well in 'Anglo-Saxon' countries like the U.S. and the U.K., where labor markets are more open and legislation provides more opportunities for entrepreneurship. The most harmful policies seem to be those that discourage or prohibit migrants and refugees from working. Nothing appears more detrimental to the well-being and economic contribution of migrants and refugees than keeping them in legal uncertainty for years due to administrative backlogs and appeals procedures. This makes it impossible for them to work, exacerbates trauma and isolation, and often forces them to rely on social welfare.

=== Naturalization as a key to integration ===
Research shows that official 'integration policies' make little difference. However, one significant exception to this rule is naturalization, or obtaining the citizenship of the host country. Migrants who acquire citizenship more quickly make significant progress in terms of employment and income. In the Netherlands, naturalization led to substantial income increases, particularly among migrants from low-income countries. This is because the certainty of citizenship motivates migrants to invest in their future.

=== Social integration ===
A similar pattern of successful long-term integration is evident in various forms of socio-cultural adaptation. This includes an increase in the number of interracial marriages and the rapid adoption of norms regarding family size and fertility rates from the host country. In European countries, more than 80% of immigrants report feeling connected to their host country. Furthermore, research in France shows that only 23% of third-generation migrants still have typically Islamic first names, compared to 90% in the first generation. This indicates a gradual adaptation to the host country’s culture.

== Other uses ==
Next to immigrants, the concept of integration can also be applied to for example people with disabilities, ethnic or religious minorities, the LGBTQIA+ community, long-term unemployed, ex-prisoners, elderly people, and youth from disadvantaged neighborhoods. In many instances education is used as a mechanism for social promotion. Neither education nor work can be ensured without a form of law. In relation to tolerant and open societies, members of minority groups often use social integration to gain full access to the opportunities, rights and services available to the members of the mainstream of society with cultural institutions such as churches and civic organizations. Mass media content also performs a social integration function in mass societies.

A 2012 research review found that working-class students were less socially integrated than middle class students at university.

From a demographic and cultural standpoint, recent longitudinal studies suggest that social isolation or integration has shown to increase in older Spanish individuals, especially those whom may be suffering from neurocognitive disorders such as dementia and overall cognitive decline.

== Best practices ==
The United Nations has a Social Integration Branch, which is a part of the Division for Social Policy and Development (Department of Economic and Social Affairs). It also issues a quarterly publication named Bulletin on Social Integration Policies. The UN Alliance of Civilizations initiative works on Migration and Integration as a key for intercultural understanding. An Online Community on Migration and Integration shows Good Practices from around the world.

The 2005 documentary "Utan gränser – en film om idrott och integration" (Without Borders – A Film About Sports and Integration) was a film described by Swedish newspaper Aftonbladet as "a documentary on how to succeed with integration" of migrants into Swedish society.

== Mutual understanding ==
In migration and integration education and in social institutions such as community organizations, in schools, engaged volunteers, social workers, social pedagogues and helpers, one encounters different perspectives and migration backgrounds again and again. Not only people who help asylum seekers work together with people from a different cultural context, this work is also significant for social educators, social workers, teachers, counselors, family helpers, committed volunteers, caregivers, authorities and the police - as it is in general in social coexistence. Communication problems caused by the different cultures arise from the perspective of non-migrants when working in the above-mentioned areas with refugees, migrants and asylum seekers from different cultures. Misunderstandings can be caused; or actions, expressions, attitudes or statements of values or behaviors can be unintentionally misunderstood or misinterpreted. These obstacles in the way of understanding with people from a different cultural background have major potential to have negative effects that need to be overcome. Therefore, it is also the responsibility of migration and integration counselors to practice a form of intercultural communication that is acceptable to all parties involved. In a society where many people with a migration background live, mutual understanding is crucial to promote a future of appreciation, robustness and diversity from all sides. Intercultural understanding and communication is a real social challenge for social services - and for society as a whole.

== See also ==
- Acculturation
- Contact hypothesis
- Cultural diversity
- Integration of immigrants
- Jim Crow laws
- Sex segregation
- Suffrage
- TPI-theory
