= Onboarding =

Management jargon

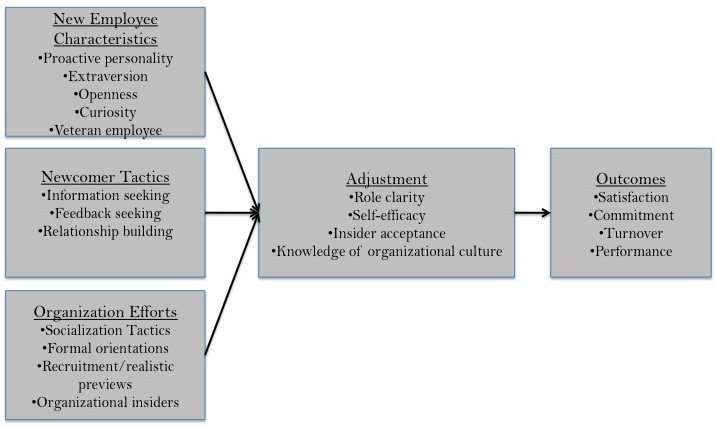
A model of onboarding (adapted from Bauer & Erdogan, 2011)

Onboarding or organizational socialization is the American term for the mechanism through which new employees acquire the necessary knowledge, skills, and behaviors to become effective organizational members and insiders. In varieties of English other than American English, this may also be referred to as "induction". In the United States, up to 25% of workers are organizational newcomers engaged in onboarding process.

Tactics used in this process include formal meetings, lectures, videos, printed materials, or computer-based orientations that outline the operations and culture of the organization that the employee is entering into. This process is known in other parts of the world as an 'induction' or training.

Studies have documented that socialization techniques such as onboarding lead to positive outcomes for new employees. These include higher job satisfaction, better job performance, greater organizational commitment, and reduction in occupational stress and intent to quit.

The term "onboarding" is management jargon coined in the 1970s.

== Antecedents of success ==
Researchers separate the process of onboarding into three parts: new employee characteristics, new employee behaviors, and organizational efforts.

=== New employee characteristics ===
New employee characteristics attempt to identify key personality traits in onboarding employees that the business views as beneficial:

- Proactive personality is the tendency to take charge of situations and achieve control over one's environment. This type of personality is considered beneficial for employees in helping them to better adapt to the organization and become high-functioning organizational members, as well as increasing satisfaction and performance.
- Curiosity is believed to play a substantial role in the newcomer adaptation process and is defined as the "desire to acquire knowledge" that energizes individual exploration of an organization's culture and norms.

Finally, employees are segmented based on Employee experience levels as it has a material effect on understanding and ability to assimilate into a new role.

=== New employee behaviors ===
New employee behaviors refer to the process of encouraging and identifying behaviors that are viewed as beneficial to company culture and the onboarding process.

Two examples of these behaviors are building relationships and seeking information and feedback.

Information seeking occurs when new employees ask questions of their co-workers and superiors in an effort to learn about their new job and the company's norms, expectations, procedures, and policies. This is viewed as beneficial throughout the onboarding process and beyond into the characteristics of a functional employee more generally.

Feedback seeking is similar to information seeking but refers to new employee efforts to gauge how to behave in their new organization. A new employee may ask co-workers or superiors for feedback on how well he or she is performing certain job tasks or whether certain behaviors are appropriate in the social and political context of the organization. In seeking constructive criticism about their actions, new employees learn what kinds of behaviors are expected, accepted, or frowned upon within the company or work group. Instances of feedback inquiry vary across cultural contexts such that individuals high in self-assertiveness and cultures low in power distance report more feedback seeking than newcomers in cultures where self-assertiveness is low and power distance is high.

Also called networking, relationship building involves an employee's efforts to develop camaraderie with co-workers and even supervisors. This can be achieved informally through simply talking to their new peers during a coffee break or through more formal means such as taking part in pre-arranged company events.

=== Employee and supervisor relationships ===
Positive communication and relationships between employees and supervisors is important for worker morale. The way in which a message is delivered affects how supervisors develop relationships and feelings about employees. When developing a relationship evaluating personal reputation, delivery style, and message content all played important factors in the perceptions between supervisors and employees. Yet, when supervisors were assessing work competence, they primarily focused on the content of what they were discussing or the message. Creating interpersonal, professional relationships between employees and supervisors in organizations helps foster productive working relationships.

== Tactics ==
Organizations invest a great amount of time and resources into the training and orientation of new company hires. Organizations differ in the variety of socialization activities they offer in order to integrate productive new workers. Possible activities include socialization tactics, formal orientation programs, recruitment strategies, and mentorship opportunities. Socialization tactics, or orientation tactics, are designed based on an organization's needs, values, and structural policies. Organizations either favor a systematic approach to socialization, or a "sink or swim" approach – in which new employees are challenged to figure out existing norms and company expectations without guidance.

=== Van Maanen and Schein model (1979) ===
John Van Maanen and Edgar H. Schein have identified six major tactical dimensions that characterize and represent all of the ways in which organizations may differ in their approaches to socialization.

==== Collective and individual socialization ====
Collective socialization is the process of taking a group of new hires and giving them the same training. Examples of this include basic training/boot camp for a military organization, pledging for fraternities/sororities, and education in graduate schools. Individual socialization allows newcomers to experience unique training, separate from others. Examples of this process include but are not limited to apprenticeship programs, specific internships, and "on-the-job" training.

Formal and informal socialization

Formal socialization refers to when newcomers are trained separately from current employees within the organization. These practices single out newcomers, or completely segregate them from the other employees. Formal socialization is witnessed in programs such as police academies, internships, and apprenticeships. Informal socialization processes involve little to no effort to distinguish the two groups. Informal tactics provide a less intimidating environment for recruits to learn their new roles via trial and error. Examples of informal socialization include on-the-job training assignments, apprenticeship programs with no clearly defined role, and using a situational approach in which a newcomer is placed into a work group with no recruit role.

Sequential and random socialization

Sequential socialization refers to the degree to which an organization provides identifiable steps for newcomers to follow during the onboarding process. Random socialization occurs when the sequence of steps leading to the targeted role are unknown, and the progression of socialization is ambiguous; for example, while there are numerous steps or stages leading to specific organizational roles, there is no specific order in which the steps should be taken.

Fixed and variable socialization

This dimension refers to whether or not the organization provides a timetable to complete socialization. Fixed socialization provides a new hire with the exact knowledge of the time it will take to complete a given passage. For instance, some management trainees can be put on "fast tracks", where they are required to accept assignments on an annual basis, despite their own preferences. Variable techniques allow newcomers to complete the onboarding process when they feel comfortable in their position. This type of socialization is commonly associated with up-and-coming careers in business organizations; this is due to several uncontrollable factors such as the state of the economy or turnover rates which determine whether a given newcomer will be promoted to a higher level or not.

Serial and disjunctive socialization

A serial socialization process refers to experienced members of the organization mentoring newcomers. One example of serial socialization would be a first-year police officer being assigned patrol duties with an officer who has been in law enforcement for a lengthy period of time. Disjunctive socialization, in contrast, refers to when newcomers do not follow the guidelines of their predecessors; no mentors are assigned to inform new recruits on how to fulfill their duties.

Investiture and divestiture socialization

This tactic refers to the degree to which a socialization process either confirms or denies the personal identities of the new employees. Investiture socialization processes document what positive characteristics newcomers bring to the organization. When using this socialization process, the organization makes use of their preexisting skills, values, and attitudes. Divestiture socialization is a process that organizations use to reject and remove the importance of personal characteristics a new hire has; this is meant to assimilate them with the values of the workplace. Many organizations require newcomers to sever previous ties and forget old habits in order to create a new self-image based upon new assumptions.

Thus, tactics influence the socialization process by defining the type of information newcomers receive, the source of this information, and the ease of obtaining it.

=== Jones' model (1986) ===
Building on the work of Van Maanen and Schein, Jones (1986) proposed that the previous six dimensions could be reduced to two categories: institutionalized and individualized socialization. Companies that use institutionalized socialization tactics implement step-by-step programs, have group orientations, and implement mentor programs. One example of an organization using institutionalized tactics include incoming freshmen at universities, who may attend orientation weekends before beginning classes. Other organizations use individualized socialization tactics, in which the new employee immediately starts working on his or her new position and figures out company norms, values, and expectations along the way. In this orientation system, individuals must play a more proactive role in seeking out information and initiating work relationships.

=== Formal orientations ===
Regardless of the socialization tactics used, formal orientation programs can facilitate understanding of company culture and introduces new employees to their work roles and the organizational social environment. Formal orientation programs consist of lectures, videotapes, and written material. More recent approaches, such as computer-based orientations and Internets, have been used by organizations to standardize training programs across branch locations. A review of the literature indicates that orientation programs are successful in communicating the company's goals, history, and power structure.

=== Recruitment events ===
Recruitment events play a key role in identifying which potential employees are a good fit for an organization. Recruiting events allow employees to gather initial information about an organization's expectations and company culture. By providing a realistic job preview of what life inside the organization is like, companies can weed out potential employees who are clearly a misfit to an organization; individuals can identify which employment agencies are the most suitable match for their own personal values, goals, and expectations. Research has shown that new employees who receive a great amount of information about the job prior to being socialized tend to adjust better. Organizations can also provide realistic job previews by offering internship opportunities.

=== Mentorship ===
Mentorship has demonstrated importance in the socialization of new employees. Ostroff and Kozlowski (1993) discovered that newcomers with mentors become more knowledgeable about the organization than did newcomers without. Mentors can help newcomers better manage their expectations and feel comfortable with their new environment through advice-giving and social support. Chatman (1991) found that newcomers are more likely to have internalized the key values of their organization's culture if they had spent time with an assigned mentor and attended company social events. Literature has also suggested the importance of demographic matching between organizational mentors and mentees. Enscher & Murphy (1997) examined the effects of similarity (race and gender) on the amount of contact and quality of mentor relationships. What often separates rapid onboarding programs from their slower counterparts is not the availability of a mentor, but the presence of a "buddy", someone the newcomer can comfortably ask questions that are either trivial ("How do I order office supplies?") or politically sensitive ("Whose opinion really matters here?"). Buddies can help establish relationships with co-workers in ways that can't always be facilitated by a newcomer's manager.

=== Online onboarding ===
Online onboarding, i.e., digital onboarding, means onboarding training that is carried out partially or fully online. Onboarding a new employee is a process where a new hire gets to know the company and its culture and receives the means and knowledge needed to become a productive team member. By onboarding online organizations can use technology to follow the onboarding process, automatize basic forms, follow new employees' progress and see when they may need additional help during the online onboarding training.

==== Advantages of online onboarding ====
Traditional face-to-face onboarding is often a one-way conversation, but online onboarding can make the onboarding process a more worthwhile experience for new hires. The main advantages of online onboarding compared to traditional face-to-face onboarding are considered to be:

- The management team no longer needs to go through the same parts with everyone personally.
- Online onboarding makes sure that all mandatory topics are covered and understood.
- Training is conducted equally for all employees.
- The employee can flexibly go through parts of the online onboarding process individually.
- Materials can be accessed later if needed.

==== Disadvantages of online onboarding ====
Online onboarding requires more thought and structured processes to be adequate and functional compared to the traditional onboarding process. Online onboarding does not offer face-to-face interaction between the onboarding trainer and the new employee in comparison to on-site onboarding. Traditional onboarding also allows better communication, and the development of personal connections and keeps new hires invested in the process compared to online onboarding.

== Employee adjustment ==
=== Role clarity ===
Role clarity describes a new employee's understanding of their job responsibilities and organizational role. One of the goals of an onboarding process is to aid newcomers in reducing uncertainty, making it easier for them to get their jobs done correctly and efficiently. Because there often is a disconnect between the main responsibilities listed in job descriptions and the specific, repeatable tasks that employees must complete to be successful in their roles, it's vital that managers are trained to discuss exactly what they expect from their employees. A poor onboarding program may produce employees who exhibit sub-par productivity because they are unsure of their exact roles and responsibilities. A strong onboarding program produces employees who are especially productive; they have a better understanding of what is expected of them. Organizations benefit from increasing role clarity for a new employee. Not only does role clarity imply greater productivity, but it has also been linked to both job satisfaction and organizational commitment.

=== Self-efficacy ===
Self-efficacy is the degree to which new employees feel capable of successfully completing and fulfilling their responsibilities. Employees who feel they can get the job done fare better than those who feel overwhelmed in their new positions; research has found that job satisfaction, organizational commitment, and turnover are all correlated with feelings of self-efficacy. Research suggests social environments that encourage teamwork and employee autonomy help increase feelings of competence; this is also a result of support from co-workers, and managerial support having less impact on feelings of self-efficacy.

=== Social acceptance ===
Social acceptance gives new employees the support needed to be successful. While role clarity and self-efficacy are important to a newcomer's ability to meet the requirements of a job, the feeling of "fitting in" can do a lot for one's view of the work environment and has been shown to increase commitment to an organization and decrease turnover. In order for onboarding to be effective employees must help in their own onboarding process by interacting with other coworkers and supervisors socially, and involving themselves in functions involving other employees. The length of hire also determines social acceptance, often by influencing how much an employee is willing to change to maintain group closeness. Individuals who are hired with an expected long-term position are more likely to work toward fitting in with the main group, avoiding major conflicts. Employees who are expected to work in the short-term often are less invested in maintaining harmony with peers. This impacts the level of acceptance from existing employee groups, depending on the future job prospects of the new hire and their willingness to fit in.

Identity impacts social acceptance as well. If an individual with a marginalized identity feels as if they are not accepted, they will suffer negative consequences. It has been shown that when LGBT employees conceal their identities at work they are a higher risk for mental health problems, as well as physical illness. They are also more likely to experience low satisfaction and commitment at their job. Employees possessing disabilities may struggle to be accepted in the workplace due to coworkers' beliefs about the capability of the individual to complete their tasks. Black employees who are not accepted in the workplace and face discrimination experience decreased job satisfaction, which can cause them to perform poorly in the workplace resulting in monetary and personnel costs to organizations.

=== Knowledge of organizational culture ===
Knowledge of organizational culture refers to how well a new employee understands a company's values, goals, roles, norms, and overall organizational environment. For example, some organizations may have very strict, yet unspoken, rules of how interactions with superiors should be conducted or whether overtime hours are the norm and an expectation. Knowledge of one's organizational culture is important for the newcomer looking to adapt to a new company, as it allows for social acceptance and aids in completing work tasks in a way that meets company standards. Overall, knowledge of organizational culture has been linked to increased satisfaction and commitment, as well as decreased turnover.

== Outcomes ==
Historically, organizations have overlooked the influence of business practices in shaping enduring work attitudes and have underestimated its impact on financial success. Employees' job attitudes are particularly important from an organization's perspective because of their link to employee engagement, productivity and performance on the job. Employee engagement attitudes, such as organizational commitment or satisfaction, are important factors in an employee's work performance. This translates into strong monetary gains for organizations. As research has demonstrated, individuals who are satisfied with their jobs and show organizational commitment are likely to perform better and have lower turnover rates. Unengaged employees are very costly to organizations in terms of slowed performance and potential rehiring expenses. With the onboarding process, there can be short term and long-term outcomes. Short term outcomes include self-efficacy, role clarity, and social integration. Self-efficacy is the confidence a new employee has when going into a new job. Role clarity is the expectation and knowledge they have about the position. Social integration is the new relationships they form, and how comfortable they are in those relationships, once they have secured that position. Long term outcomes consist of organizational commitment, and job satisfaction. How satisfied the employee is after onboarding, can either help the company, or prevent it from succeeding.

== Limits and criticisms of onboarding theory ==
The outcomes of organizational socialization have been positively associated with the process of uncertainty reduction, but are not desirable to all organizations. Jones (1986) and Allen and Meyer (1990) found that socialization tactics were related to commitment, but negatively correlated to role clarity. Because formal socialization tactics protect the newcomer from their full responsibilities while "learning the ropes," there is a potential for role confusion once the new hire fully enters the organization. In some cases, organizations desire a certain level of person-organizational misfit in order to achieve outcomes via innovative behaviors. Depending on the culture of the organization, it may be more desirable to increase ambiguity, despite the potentially negative connection with organizational commitment.

Additionally, socialization researchers have had major concerns over the length of time that it takes newcomers to adjust. There has been great difficulty determining the role that time plays, but once the length of the adjustment is determined, organizations can make appropriate recommendations regarding what matters most in various stages of the adjustment process.

Further criticisms include the use of special orientation sessions to educate newcomers about the organization and strengthen their organizational commitment. While these sessions have been found to be formal and ritualistic, studies have found them unpleasant or traumatic. Orientation sessions are a frequently used socialization tactic, however, employees have not found them to be helpful, nor has any research provided any evidence for their benefits.

== Executive onboarding ==
Executive onboarding is the application of general onboarding principles to helping new executives become productive members of an organization. It involves acquiring, accommodating, assimilating and accelerating new executives. Hiring teams emphasize the importance of making the most of the new hire's "honeymoon" stage in the organization, a period which is described as either the first 90 to 100 days, or the first full year.

Effective onboarding of new executives is an important contribution hiring managers, direct supervisors or human resource professionals make to long-term organizational success; executive onboarding done right can improve productivity and executive retention, and build corporate culture. 40 percent of executives hired at the senior level are pushed out, fail, or quit within 18 months without effective socialization.

Onboarding is valuable for externally recruited, or those recruited from outside the organization, executives. It may be difficult for those individuals to uncover personal, organizational, and role risks in complicated situations when they lack formal onboarding assistance. Onboarding is also an essential tool for executives promoted into new roles and/or transferred from one business unit to another.

== Socialization in online organizations ==
The effectiveness of socialization varies depending on the structure and communication within the organization, and the ease of joining or leaving the organization. These are dimensions that online organizations differ from conventional ones. This type of communication makes the development and maintenance of social relationships with other group members difficult to accomplish and weaken organizational commitment. Joining and leaving online communities typically involves less cost than a conventional employment organization, which results in lower level of commitment.

Socialization processes in most online communities are informal and individualistic, as compared with socialization in conventional organizations. For example, lurkers in online communities typically have no opportunities for formal mentorship, because they are less likely to be known to existing members of the community. Another example is Wiki Projects, the task-oriented group in Wikipedia, rarely use institutional socialization tactics to socialize new members who join them, as they rarely assign the new member a mentor or provide clear guidelines. A third example is the socialization of newcomers to the Python open-source software development community. Even though there exists clear workflows and distinct social roles, socialization process is still informal.

== Recommendations for practitioners ==
Scholars at MIT Sloan, suggest that practitioners should seek to design an onboarding strategy that takes individual newcomer characteristics into consideration and encourages proactive behaviors, such as information seeking, that help facilitate the development of role clarity, self-efficacy, social acceptance, and knowledge of organizational culture. Research has consistently shown that doing so produces valuable outcomes such as high job satisfaction (the extent to which one enjoys the nature of his or her work), organizational commitment (the connection one feels to an organization), and job performance in employees, as well as lower turnover rates and decreased intent to quit.

In terms of structure, evidence shows that formal institutionalized socialization is the most effective onboarding method. New employees who complete these kinds of programs tend to experience more positive job attitudes and lower levels of turnover in comparison to those who undergo individualized tactics. Evidence suggests that in-person onboarding techniques are more effective than virtual ones. Though it initially appears to be less expensive for a company to use a standard computer-based orientation programs, some previous research has demonstrated that employees learn more about their roles and company culture through face-to-face orientation.

== See also ==
- Employment
- Employee offboarding
- Employee engagement
- Employee motivation
- Industrial and organizational psychology
- Induction programme
- Job Shadowing
- Job performance
- Job satisfaction
- Mentoring
- Business networking
- Organizational commitment
- Organizational culture
- Personnel psychology
- Realistic job preview
- Recruitment
- Socialization
- Personality–job fit theory
- Person–environment fit
- Induction training
