= Personality–job fit theory =

Form of organizational psychology

Personality–job fit theory is a form of organizational psychology, that postulates that an individual's personality traits will reveal insight into their adaptability within an organization. The degree of confluence between a person and the organization is expressed as their Person-Organization (P-O) fit. This is also referred to as a person–environment fit. A common measure of the P-O fit is workplace efficacy - the rate at which workers are able to complete tasks. These tasks are affected by environmental factors within the workplace. For example, a worker who is more efficient working as an individual, rather than in a team, will have a higher P-O fit for a workplace that stresses individual tasks (such as accountancy). By matching the right personality with the right job, company workers can achieve a better synergy and avoid pitfalls such as high turnover and low job satisfaction. Employees are more likely to stay committed to organizations if the fit is 'good'.

In practice, P-O fit is used to gauge integration with organizational competencies. The individual is assessed on these competencies, which reveals efficacy, motivation, influence, and co-worker respect. Competencies can be assessed in assessment centres using various tools such as psychological tests and competency-based interviews.

If an individual displays a high P-O fit, it indicates they can adjust to the company environment and work culture, and perform at an optimum level.

== See also ==
- Aptitude – Ability; competence to do a certain kind of work at a certain level
- Cognitive ergonomics – Designing to suit cognitive abilities
- Onboarding – Management jargon
- Person-environment fit – Compatibility of characteristics
- Social influence – Alteration of attitudes and behaviors based on outside influences
- Trait activation theory – Theory of personality-job fit
