= Hangover =

Discomfort following alcohol consumption

- Other names: veisalgia from Norwegian: kveis, "discomfort following overindulgence", and Greek: ἄλγος álgos, "pain"
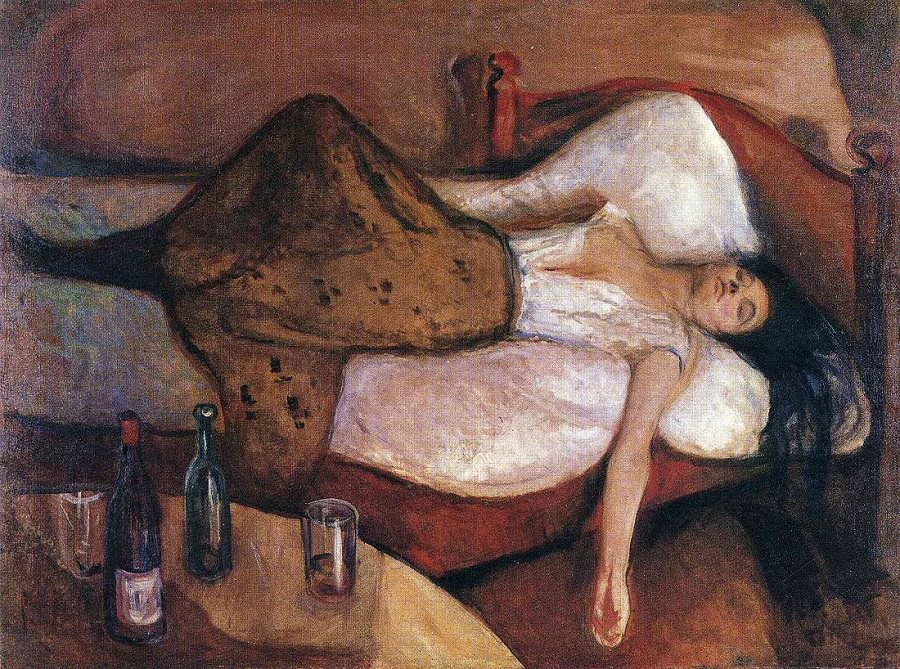
- The Day After by Edvard Munch, 1894–95
- Pronunciation: /ˈhæŋoʊvər/
- Specialty: Neurology, Psychiatry, Toxicology
- Symptoms: Headache, fatigue, loss of appetite, dizziness, nausea, vomiting, anxiety

A hangover is the experience of various unpleasant physiological and psychological effects usually following the consumption of alcohol. Hangovers can last for several hours or for more than 24 hours. Typical symptoms of a hangover may include headache, drowsiness, weakness, concentration problems, dry mouth, dizziness, fatigue, muscle ache, gastrointestinal distress (e.g., nausea, vomiting, diarrhea), loss of appetite, light sensitivity, depression, sweating, hyper-excitability, high blood pressure, irritability, and anxiety.

While the causes of a hangover are still poorly understood, several factors are known to be involved including acetaldehyde accumulation, changes in the immune system and glucose metabolism, dehydration, metabolic acidosis, disturbed prostaglandin synthesis, increased cardiac output, vasodilation, sleep deprivation, and malnutrition. Beverage-specific effects of additives or by-products such as congeners in alcoholic beverages also play an important role. The symptoms usually occur after the intoxicating effect of the alcohol begins to wear off, generally the morning after a night of heavy drinking.

Though many possible remedies and folk cures have been suggested, there is no compelling evidence to suggest that any are effective for preventing or treating hangovers. Avoiding alcohol or drinking in moderation are the most effective ways to avoid a hangover. The socioeconomic consequences of hangovers include workplace absenteeism, impaired job performance, reduced productivity and poor academic achievement. A hangover may also impair performance during potentially dangerous daily activities such as driving a car or operating heavy machinery.

== Signs and symptoms ==
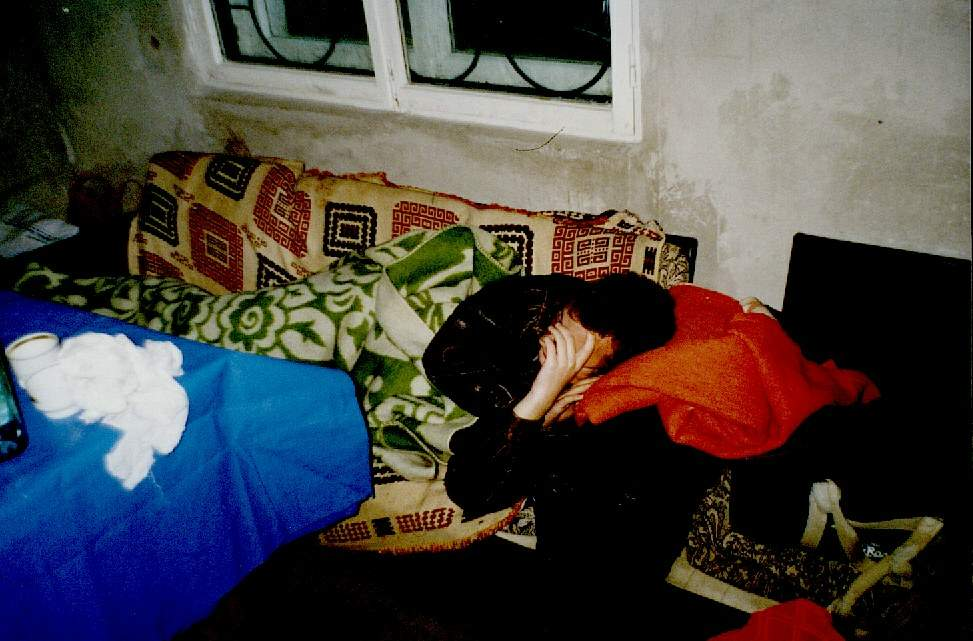
One of the signs of a severe hangover is a headache.

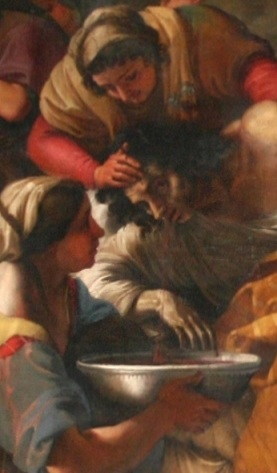
A painting from 1681 showing a person affected by vomiting, a typical symptom of alcohol hangover

An alcohol hangover is associated with a variety of symptoms that may include drowsiness, headache, concentration problems, dry mouth, dizziness, gastrointestinal complaints, fatigue, sweating, nausea, hyper-excitability, anxiety, and a feeling of general discomfort that may last more than 24 hours. Alcohol hangover symptoms develop when blood alcohol concentration falls considerably and peak when it returns to almost zero. Hangover symptoms validated in controlled studies include general malaise, thirst, headache, feeling dizzy or faint, tiredness, loss of appetite, nausea, stomach ache, and feeling as though one's heart is racing. Some symptoms, such as changes in sleep pattern and gastrointestinal distress, are attributed to direct effects of the alcohol intoxication, or withdrawal symptoms. Drowsiness and impaired cognitive function are the two dominant features of alcohol hangover.

Some people experience anxiety, including a sense of worry, stress, and unease, during a hangover, colloquially called hangxiety. Hangxiety affects about 12% of people. The cause of hangxiety has not been identified. Hangxiety can manifest in various ways, such as racing thoughts, a sense of dread, increased heart rate, or feelings of guilt or regret about actions taken while under the influence of alcohol. It can be experienced by anyone who consumes alcohol, but individuals with underlying anxiety disorders or mental health conditions may be more susceptible to this phenomenon.

== Causes ==
Hangovers are usually caused by alcohol consumption, but other components of alcoholic beverages might contribute to hangover symptoms or make a hangover worse. For example, congeners are compounds, other than ethyl alcohol, that are produced during fermentation. These substances contribute to the taste and smell of alcoholic beverages. Darker spirits, such as bourbon, which tend to have higher levels of congeners than clear spirits, could worsen hangover symptoms for some people. Sulfites are compounds that are added to wine as preservatives. People who have a sensitivity to sulfites may experience a headache after drinking wine.

Several pathophysiological changes may give rise to the alcohol hangover, including increased levels of acetaldehyde, hormonal alterations of the cytokine pathways, and a decrease in the availability of glucose. Additional associated phenomena are dehydration, metabolic acidosis, disturbed prostaglandin synthesis, increased cardiac output, vasodilation, sleep deprivation and insufficient eating.

=== Pathophysiology ===
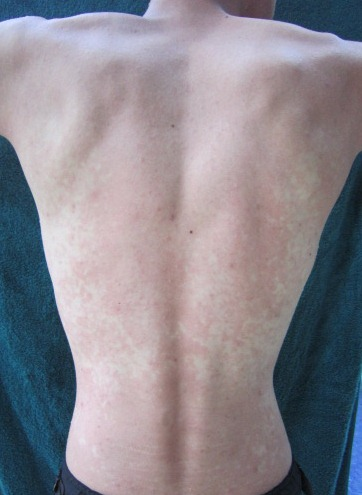
Alcohol flush reaction as a result of the accumulation of acetaldehyde, the first metabolite of alcohol

After being ingested, the ethanol in alcoholic beverages is first converted to acetaldehyde by the enzyme alcohol dehydrogenase and then to acetic acid by oxidation and the egestion process. These reactions also convert nicotinamide adenine dinucleotide (NAD^{+}) to its reduced form NADH in a redox reaction. By causing an imbalance of the NAD^{+}/NADH redox system, alcoholic beverages make normal bodily functions more difficult. Consequences of the alcohol induced redox changes in the human body include increased triglyceride production, increased amino acid catabolism, inhibition of the citric acid cycle, lactic acidosis, ketoacidosis, hyperuricemia, disturbance in cortisol and androgen metabolism and increased fibrogenesis. The metabolism of glucose and insulin are also influenced. However, recent studies showed no significant correlation between hangover severity and the concentrations of various hormones, electrolytes, free fatty acids, triglycerides, lactate, ketone bodies, cortisol, and glucose in blood and urine samples.

Alcohol also induces the CYP2E1 enzyme, which metabolizes ethanol and other substances into more reactive toxins. In particular, in binge drinking the enzyme is activated and plays a role in creating a harmful condition known as oxidative stress, which can lead to cell death.

=== Acetaldehyde ===
Acetaldehyde, the first by-product of ethanol, is between 10 and 30 times more toxic than alcohol itself and can remain at an elevated plateau for many hours after initial ethanol consumption. In addition, certain genetic factors can amplify the negative effects of acetaldehyde. For example, some people (predominantly East Asians) have a mutation in their alcohol dehydrogenase gene that makes this enzyme unusually fast at converting ethanol to acetaldehyde. In addition, about half of all East Asians convert acetaldehyde to acetic acid more slowly (via acetaldehyde dehydrogenase), causing a higher buildup of acetaldehyde than normally seen in other groups. The high concentration of acetaldehyde causes the alcohol flush reaction, colloquially known as the "Asian Flush". Since the alcohol flush reaction is highly uncomfortable and the possibility of hangovers is immediate and severe, people with this gene variant are less likely to become alcoholics.

Acetaldehyde may also influence glutathione peroxidase, a key antioxidant enzyme, and increases the susceptibility to oxidative stress. Likewise, acetic acid (or the acetate ion) can cause additional problems. One study found that injecting sodium acetate into rats caused them to have nociceptive behavior (headaches). In addition, there is a biochemical explanation for this finding. High acetate levels cause adenosine to accumulate in many parts of the brain. But when the rats were given caffeine, which blocks the action of adenosine, they no longer experienced headaches.

=== Congeners ===
In addition to ethanol and water, most alcoholic drinks also contain congeners, either as flavoring or as a by-product of fermentation and the wine aging process. While ethanol is by itself sufficient to produce most hangover effects, congeners may potentially aggravate hangover and other residual effects to some extent. Congeners include substances such as amines, amides, acetones, acetaldehydes, polyphenols, methanol, histamines, fusel oil, esters, furfural, and tannins, many but not all of which are toxic. One study in mice indicates that fusel oil may have a mitigating effect on hangover symptoms, while some whiskey congeners such as butanol protect the stomach against gastric mucosal damage in the rat. Different types of alcoholic beverages contain different amounts of congeners. In general, dark liquors have a higher concentration while clear liquors have a lower concentration. Whereas vodka has virtually no more congeners than pure ethanol, bourbon has a total congener content 37 times higher than that found in vodka.

Several studies have examined whether certain types of alcohol cause worse hangovers. All four studies concluded that darker liquors, which have higher congeners, produced worse hangovers. One even showed that hangovers were worse and more frequent with darker liquors. In a 2006 study, an average of 14 standard drinks (330 ml each) of beer was needed to produce a hangover, but only 7 to 8 drinks was required for wine or liquor (note that one standard drink has the same amount of alcohol regardless of type). Another study ranked several drinks by their ability to cause a hangover as follows (from low to high): distilled ethanol diluted with fruit juice, beer, vodka, gin, white wine, whisky, rum, red wine, and brandy.

One potent congener is methanol. It is naturally formed in small quantities during fermentation, and it can be accidentally concentrated by improper distillation techniques. Metabolism of methanol produces some extremely toxic compounds, such as formaldehyde and formic acid, which may play a role in the severity of hangover. Ethanol slows the conversion of methanol into its toxic metabolites so that most of the methanol can be excreted harmlessly in the breath and urine without forming its toxic metabolites. This may explain the temporary postponement of symptoms reported in the common remedy of drinking more alcohol to relieve hangover symptoms. Since methanol metabolism is effectively inhibited by consumption of alcohol, methanol accumulates during drinking and only begins to be metabolized once ethanol has been cleared. This delayed action makes it an attractive candidate explanation for delayed post-intoxication symptoms and correlations between methanol concentrations and the presence of hangover symptoms that have been found in studies.

=== Vitamin and electrolyte loss ===
The metabolic processes required for alcohol elimination deplete essential vitamins and electrolytes. Furthermore, alcohol is a diuretic, causing excretion of electrolytes through urination. After a night of drinking, the resulting lack of key B and C vitamins, as well as potassium, magnesium, and zinc may cause fatigue, aching and other hangover-like symptoms.

=== Dehydration ===
Ethanol has a dehydrating effect by causing increased urine production (diuresis), which could cause thirst, dry mouth, dizziness, and may lead to an electrolyte imbalance. Studies suggest that electrolyte changes play only a minor role in the genesis of the alcohol hangover and are caused by dehydration effects. Drinking water may help relieve symptoms as a result of dehydration, but it is unlikely that rehydration significantly reduces the presence and severity of alcohol hangover. Alcohol's effect on the stomach lining can account for nausea because alcohol stimulates the production of hydrochloric acid in the stomach.

=== Low blood sugar ===
Studies show that alcohol hangover is associated with a decrease in blood glucose concentration (less than 70 mg/dl), but the relationship between blood glucose concentration and hangover severity is unclear. Also known as insulin shock, hypoglycemia can lead to coma or even death.

=== Immune system ===
In current research, the significant relationship between immune factors and hangover severity is the most convincing among all factors so far studied. An imbalance of the immune system, in particular of cytokine metabolism, has been identified as playing a role in the pathophysiology of the hangover state. Especially, the hangover symptoms, nausea, headache, and fatigue have been suggested to be mediated by changes in the immune system. The concentration of several cytokines is significantly increased in the blood after alcohol consumption. These include interleukin 12 (IL-12), interferon gamma (IFNγ) and interleukin 10 (IL-10). Some pharmacological studies such as on tolfenamic acid and Opuntia ficus-indica (OFI) have also indicated an involvement of the immune system. These studies suggest that the presence and severity of hangover symptoms can probably be reduced by administration of a cyclooxygenase inhibitor such as aspirin or ibuprofen.

=== Person-related factors ===
Several factors that do not in themselves cause alcohol hangover are known to influence its severity. These factors include personality, genetics, health status, age, sex, associated activities during drinking, such as smoking, the use of other drugs, physical activity such as dancing, as well as sleep quality and duration.

- Genetics: alleles associated with aldehyde dehydrogenase (ALDH) and flushing phenotypes (alcohol flush reaction) in Asians are known genetic factors that influence alcohol tolerance and the development of hangover effects. Existing data shows that drinkers with genotypes known to lead to acetaldehyde accumulation are more susceptible to hangover effects. The fact that about 25% of heavy drinkers claim that they have never had a hangover is also an indication that genetic variation plays a role in individual differences of hangover severity.
- Age: some people experience hangovers as getting worse as one ages. This is thought to be caused by declining supplies of alcohol dehydrogenase, the enzyme involved in metabolizing alcohol. Although it is actually unknown whether hangover symptoms and severity change with age, research shows that drinking patterns change across ages, and heavy drinking episodes that may result in hangover are much less often experienced as age increases.
- Sex: at the same number of drinks, women are more prone to hangover than men, and this is likely explained by sex differences in the pharmacokinetics of alcohol. Women attain a higher blood alcohol concentration (BAC) than men at the same number of drinks. At equivalent BACs, men and women appear to be indistinguishable with respect to most hangover effects.
- Cigarette smoking: acetaldehyde, which is absorbed from cigarette smoking during alcohol consumption, is regarded as a contributor to alcohol hangover symptoms.

== Management ==
"There is no magic potion for beating hangovers—and only time can help. A person must wait for the body to finish clearing the toxic byproducts of alcohol metabolism, to rehydrate, to heal irritated tissue, and to restore immune and brain activity to normal. There is no way to speed up the brain's recovery from alcohol use—drinking coffee, taking a shower, or having an alcoholic beverage the next morning will not cure a hangover." says NIAAA.

Within the limited amount of serious study on the subject, there is debate about whether a hangover may be prevented or at least mitigated. There is also a vast body of folk medicine and simple quackery. A four-page literature review in the British Medical Journal concludes: "No compelling evidence exists to suggest that any conventional or complementary intervention is effective for preventing or treating alcohol hangover. The most effective way to avoid the symptoms of alcohol induced hangover is to avoid drinking." Most remedies do not significantly reduce overall hangover severity. Some compounds reduce specific symptoms such as vomiting and headache, but are not effective in reducing other common hangover symptoms such as drowsiness and fatigue.

=== Potentially beneficial ===
- Rehydration: Drinking water before going to bed or during hangover may relieve dehydration-associated symptoms such as thirst, dizziness, dry mouth, and headache.
- Tolfenamic acid, an inhibitor of prostaglandin synthesis, in a 1983 study reduced headache, nausea, vomiting, irritation but had no effect on tiredness in 30 people.
- Pyritinol: A 1973 study found that large doses (several hundred times the recommended daily intake) of Pyritinol, a synthetic Vitamin B_{6} analog, can help to reduce hangover symptoms. Possible side effects of pyritinol include hepatitis (liver damage) due to cholestasis and acute pancreatitis.
- Yeast-based extracts: The difference in the change for discomfort, restlessness, and impatience was statistically significant, but no significant differences on blood chemistry parameters, blood alcohol, or acetaldehyde concentrations were found, and it did not significantly improve general well-being.

=== Unsupported remedies ===
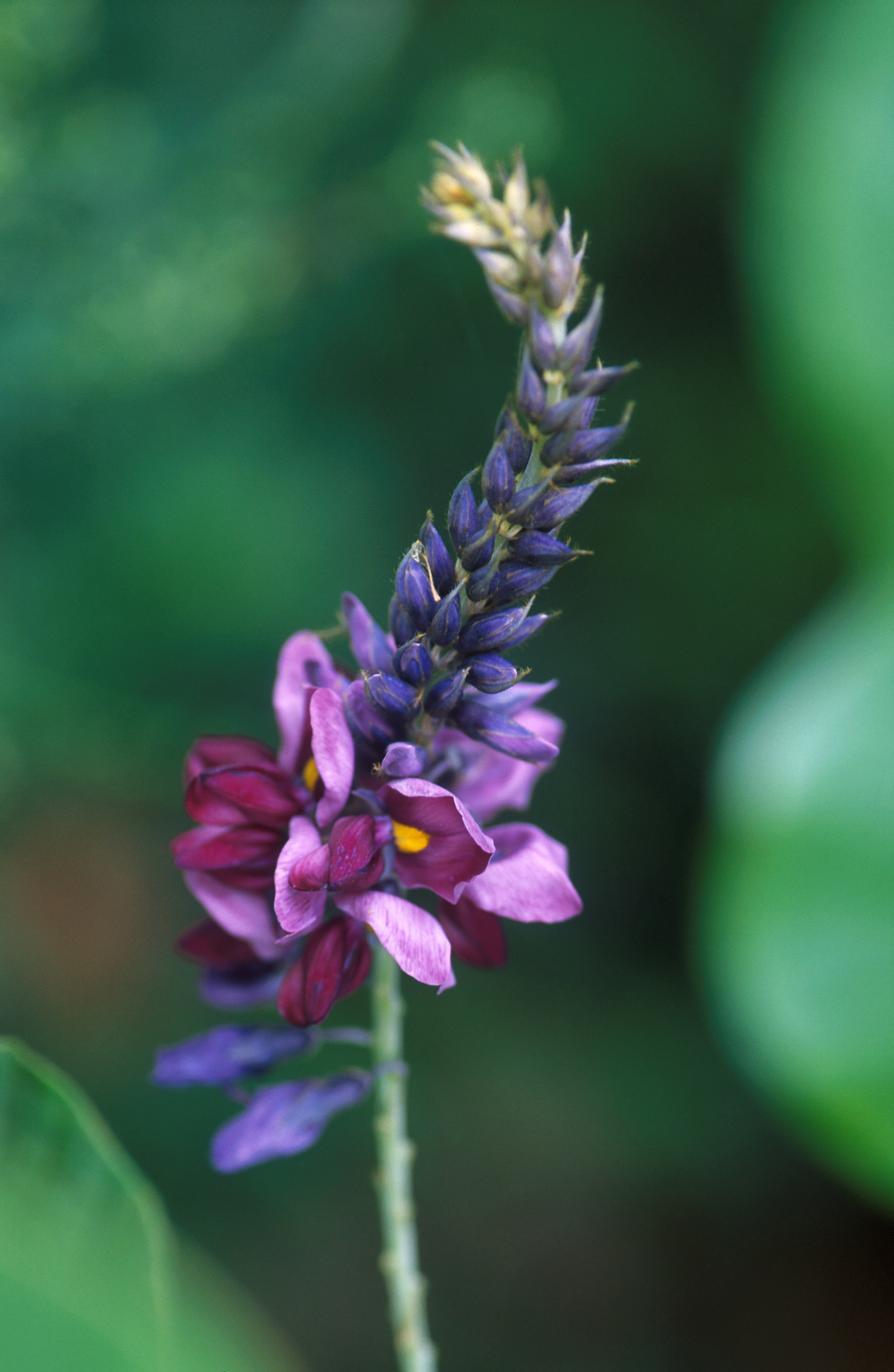
Kudzu roots (Pueraria lobata), a common ingredient in herbal hangover remedies, may have harmful effects when combined with alcohol.

Recommendations for foods, drinks, and activities to relieve hangover symptoms abound. The ancient Romans, on the authority of Pliny the Elder, favored raw owl's eggs or fried canary, while the "prairie oyster" restorative, introduced at the 1878 Paris World Exposition, calls for raw egg yolk mixed with Worcestershire sauce, Tabasco sauce, salt and pepper. By 1938, the Ritz-Carlton Hotel provided a hangover remedy in the form of a mixture of Coca-Cola and milk (Coca-Cola itself having been invented, by some accounts, as a hangover remedy). Alcoholic writer Ernest Hemingway relied on tomato juice and beer. Other purported hangover cures include cocktails such as Bloody Mary or Black Velvet (consisting of equal parts champagne and stout). A 1957 survey by an American folklorist found widespread belief in the efficacy of heavy fried foods, tomato juice and sexual activity.

Other untested or discredited treatments include:

- Hair of the dog: The belief is that consumption of further alcohol after the onset of a hangover will relieve symptoms, based upon the theory that the hangover represents a form of alcohol withdrawal and that by satiating the body's need for alcohol the symptoms will be relieved. Social drinkers and alcoholics claim that drinking more alcohol gives relief from hangover symptoms, but research shows that the use of alcohol as a hangover cure seems to predict current or future problem drinking and alcohol use disorder, through negative reinforcement and the development of physical dependence. While the practice is popular in tradition and promoted by many sellers of alcoholic beverages, medical opinion holds that the practice merely postpones the symptoms, and courts addiction. Favored choices include a Corpse Reviver, Fernet Branca and Bloody Mary.
- Kudzu (葛): the root ("lobata") been touted in the West as a remedy, though it's the flower ("flos") that is actually used in traditional remedies. A 2007 review finds evidence for the flower being potentially useful, but the root being likely harmful, as the latter is an inhibitor of ALDH2.
- Artichoke: Research shows that artichoke extract does not prevent the signs and symptoms of alcohol-induced hangover.
- Sauna or steam-bath: Medical opinion holds this may be dangerous, as the combination of alcohol and hyperthermia increases the likelihood of dangerous abnormal heart rhythms.
- Oxygen: There have been anecdotal reports from those with easy access to a breathing oxygen supply—medical staff, and military pilots—that oxygen can also reduce the symptoms of hangovers sometimes caused by alcohol consumption. The theory is that the increased oxygen flow resulting from oxygen therapy improves the metabolic rate, and thus increases the speed at which toxins are broken down. However, one source states that (in an aviation context) oxygen has no effect on physical impairment caused by hangover.
- Fructose and glucose: Glucose and fructose significantly inhibit the metabolic changes produced by alcohol intoxication; nevertheless they have no significant effect on hangover severity.
- Vitamin B_{6}: No effects on alcohol metabolism, peak blood alcohol and glucose concentrations have been found and psychomotor function is not significantly improved when using Vitamin B_{6} supplements.
- Caffeinated drinks: Caffeine narrows blood vessels and raises blood pressure, worsening the hangover conditions. It also slows down rehydration
- Consuming solely one type of alcoholic beverage ("Grape or grain but never the twain"), or consuming different types in a specific order ("Beer before wine and you'll feel fine; wine before beer and you'll feel queer"): These do not have any significant effect on the intensity of a subsequent hangover when controlling for BAC.

== Epidemiology ==
Hangovers occur commonly.

- A 1990 study of students at a rural New England university found that 25% had experienced a hangover in the previous week and 8% reported missing classes.
- Fifteen percent of men and women who have consumed alcohol experience hangovers at least monthly and 10% of British men reported hangover-related problems at work at least monthly.
- An estimated 9.23% (11.6 million workers) of the U.S. labor force work with a hangover.
- About 23% of drinkers do not report any hangover after drinking to intoxication.

== Society and culture ==
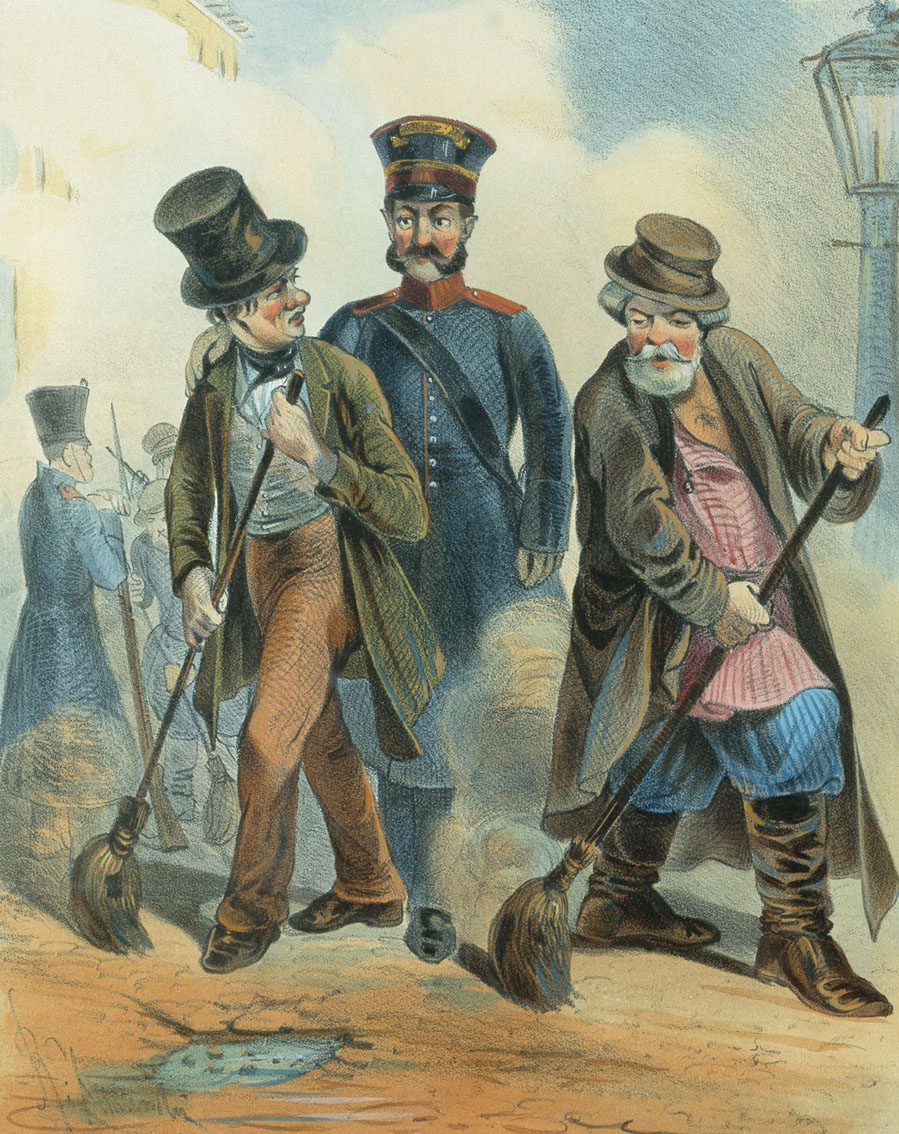
"Exercise against a hangover"

A somewhat dated French idiomatic expression for hangover is "mal aux cheveux", literally "sore hair" (or "[even] my hair hurts"). Some terms for 'hangover' are derived from names for liquor, for example, in Chile a hangover is known as a caña from a Spanish slang term for a glass of beer. Similar is the Irish 'brown bottle flu' derived from the type of bottle common to beer. In German, the hangover is known as a "Kater", literally a tomcat. The most likely origin of the term is a pun on catarrh. Nowadays, "Kater" often is understood literally, resulting in cat motifs as depictions of hangovers.

Alcohol hangover has considerable economic consequences. In Finland, a country with a population of 5 million, over 1 million workdays are lost each year because of hangovers. The average annual opportunity cost due to hangovers are estimated as 2000 (USD) per working adult. The socioeconomic implications of an alcohol hangover include workplace absenteeism, impaired job performance, reduced productivity and poor academic achievement. Potentially dangerous daily activities such as driving a car or operating heavy machinery are also negatively influenced.

In mid-2017, it was reported that one UK-based company allows sick days when hung over.

As of 2019, South Korea's 'hangover-cure product' market, which comes in various formulations such as beverages, pills, and jelly, is a 250 billion won (US$213 million) industry.

== Research ==
Psychological research of alcohol hangover is growing rapidly. The Alcohol Hangover Research Group had its inaugural meeting in June 2010 as part of the Research Society on Alcoholism (RSA) 33rd Annual Scientific Meeting in San Antonio, Texas, USA.

In 2012, Éduc'alcool, a Quebec-based non-profit organization that aims to educate the public on the responsible use of alcohol, published a report noting hangovers have long-lasting effects that inhibit the drinker's capabilities a full 24 hours after heavy drinking.

== See also ==
- Auto-brewery syndrome
- Comedown (drugs)
- Emotional exhaustion
- Food drunk
- Honeymoon-hangover effect
- Rebound effect
