= Employee offboarding =

Process for managing an employee's departure from a company

Employee offboarding describes the separation process when an employee leaves a company. The offboarding process might involve a phased transfer of knowledge from the departing employee to a new or existing employee; an exit interview; return of any company property; and various processes from the company's human resources, information technology, or legal functions.

== Purpose ==
An employee may leave a company through resignation, termination of employment and layoffs, retirement, or for other reasons. When this happens, the company will face several risks. These may include incomplete projects, loss of communication with clients, security risks, compliance risks, and other factors. An employee offboarding process is generally designed to mitigate risks and potential losses in the separation process.

Offboarding often includes the collection of feedback from the exiting employee about their experience in the organization and possible improvements to its culture. It is considered the final phase of an employee lifecycle, including recruitment, onboarding, development, retention, and exit or offboarding.

== Steps and workflows ==
Employee offboarding consists of numerous steps and workflows. These may include:

- Documenting standard operating procedures (SOPs) and knowledge transfer, including contact lists, file and record locations, and status reports on ongoing projects and tasks
- Software removal
- Termination of logins and/or accounts such as bank accounts, phones, and email addresses, with redirection to a new responsible party
- Asset reclamation, such as computer hardware and other devices
- Finalize paperwork such as Non-Disclosure Agreements, health and retirement benefits, Non-compete agreements, tax documents, and outstanding reimbursements as well as any documentation required for compliance, particularly in regulated industries
- Removal from company website, social media profiles, org charts, and other active publications
- Reclamation or destruction of sensitive and security items such as ID badges, parking tags, uniforms, and access cards or keys
- Exit interviews that may include questionnaires and surveys, as well as reviewing the information collected by company stakeholders, can be conducted effectively through an LMS platform

== Best practices ==
Employee offboarding includes several best practices.> It should be a positive experience for the employee and the company. This would include formally acknowledging the employee's time at the company and the value they created. It should also be a time when companies collect valuable feedback on improving the overall employee experience and culture and transferring knowledge wholly and efficiently. It is a common practice to facilitate knowledge transfer by making documentation an ongoing part of every employee's experience from when they are onboarded to when they leave. This includes the continuing creation and updating of SOPs. Termination of employment on the best possible terms makes ongoing communications possible. This can benefit the employee who might need referrals for future employment or copies of documentation. It can also benefit the company when knowledge is not entirely transferred, and follow-up is necessary.

Documentation at the time of employee offboarding will reduce potential issues. In addition to current SOPs, an employer should request and receive a formal resignation letter. The employer should also provide documentation to the employee, such as a record of benefits, tax documents, a final paycheck, and a final record of income earned.

Network administrators, human resources managers, department managers, and others responsible for different aspects of the offboarding process should be notified, with clear next steps. These might include account closures, login changes, and other security measures. Documents stored locally or on the cloud should be transferred to new stakeholders.

In the exit interview, clear and accurate reasons for terminating employment should be documented and filed for future use. If the employee left on good terms, then it should be made clear that the possibility of a return is likely in the future.

== See also ==
- Induction programme
- Termination of employment
- Layoff
