= Job satisfaction =

Attitude of a person towards work

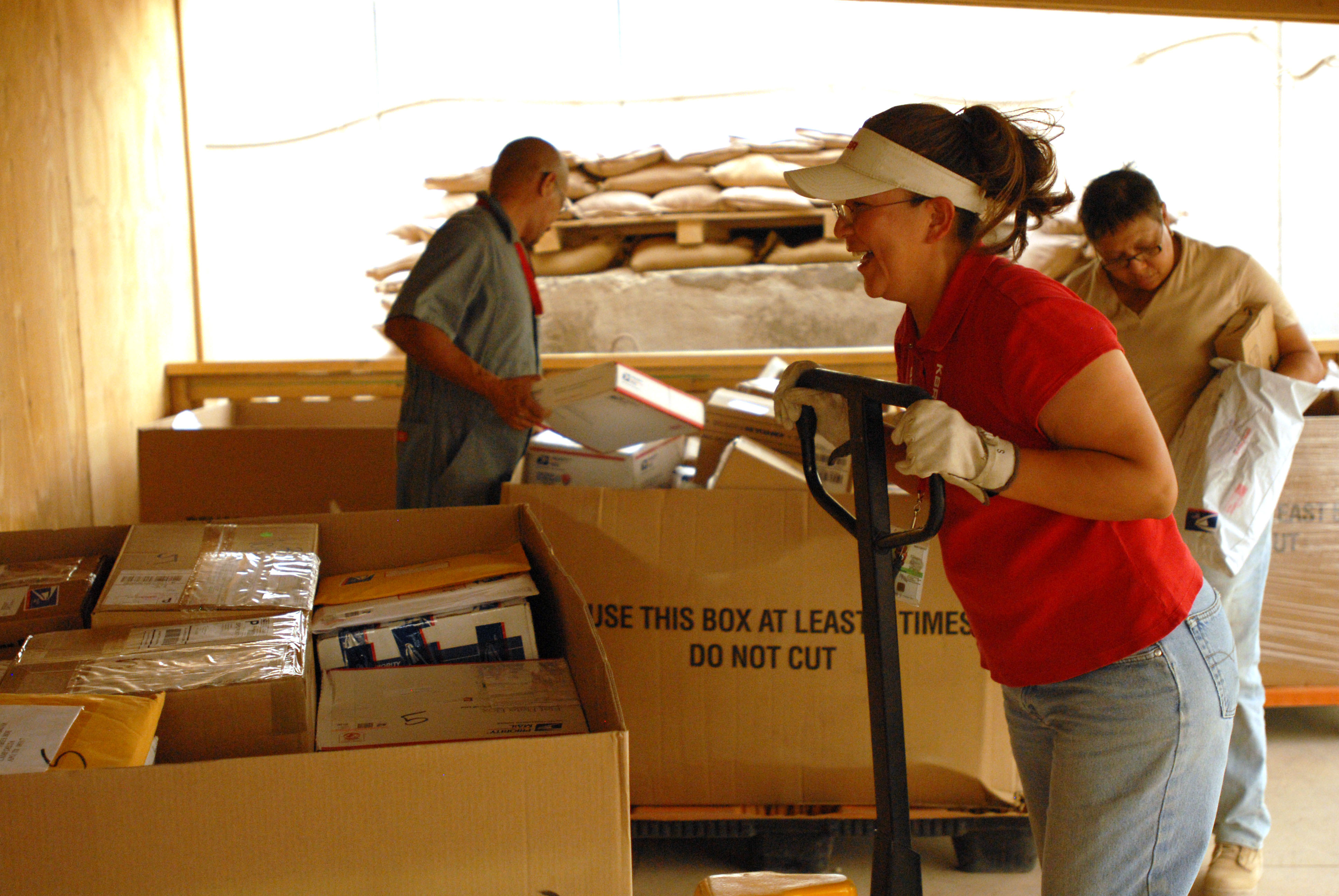
A post office worker appears to be happy as she pushes a mail cart.

Job satisfaction, employee satisfaction or work satisfaction is a measure of workers' contentment with their job, whether they like the job or individual aspects or facets of jobs, such as nature of work or supervision. Job satisfaction can be measured in cognitive (evaluative), affective (or emotional), and behavioral components. Researchers have also noted that job satisfaction measures vary in the extent to which they measure feelings about the job (affective job satisfaction). or cognitions about the job (cognitive job satisfaction).

One of the most widely used definitions in organizational research is that of Edwin A. Locke (1976), who defines job satisfaction as "a pleasurable or positive emotional state resulting from the appraisal of one's job or job experiences" (p. 1304). Others have defined it as simply how content an individual is with their job; whether they like the job.

It is assessed at both the global level (whether the individual is satisfied with the job overall), or at the facet level (whether the individual is satisfied with different aspects of the job). Spector (1997) lists 14 common facets: appreciation, communication, coworkers, fringe benefits, Job conditions, nature of the work, organization, personal growth, policies and procedures, promotion opportunities, recognition, security, and supervision.

== Evaluation ==
Hulin and Judge (2003) have noted that job satisfaction includes multidimensional psychological responses to an individual's job, and that these personal responses have cognitive (evaluative), affective (or emotional), and behavioral components. Job satisfaction scales vary in the extent to which they assess the affective feelings about the job or the cognitive assessment of the job. Affective job satisfaction is a subjective construct representing an emotional feeling individuals have about their job. Hence, affective job satisfaction for individuals reflects the degree of pleasure or happiness their job in general induces.

Cognitive job satisfaction is a more objective and logical evaluation of various facets of a job. Cognitive job satisfaction can be unidimensional if it comprises evaluation of just one facet of a job, such as pay or maternity leave, or multidimensional if two or more than two facets of a job are simultaneously evaluated. Cognitive job satisfaction does not assess the degree of pleasure or happiness that arises from specific job facets, but rather gauges the extent to which those job facets are judged by the job holder to be satisfactory in comparison with objectives they themselves set or with other jobs. While cognitive job satisfaction might help to bring about affective job satisfaction, the two constructs are distinct, not necessarily directly related, and have different antecedents and consequences.

Job satisfaction can also be seen within the broader context of the range of issues which affect an individual's experience of work, or their quality of working life. Job satisfaction can be understood in terms of its relationships with other key factors, such as general well-being, stress at work, control at work, home-work interface, and working conditions.

== History ==
The assessment of job satisfaction through employee anonymous surveys became commonplace in the 1930s. Although prior to that time there was the beginning of interest in employee attitudes, there were only a handful of studies published. Latham and Budworth note that Uhrbrock in 1934 was one of the first psychologists to use the newly developed attitude measurement techniques to assess factory worker attitudes. They also note that in 1935 Hoppock conducted a study that focused explicitly on job satisfaction that is affected by both the nature of the job and relationships with coworkers and supervisors.

== Models ==
=== Affect theory ===
Edwin A. Locke's Range of Affect Theory (1976) is arguably the most famous job satisfaction model. The main premise of this theory is that satisfaction is determined by a discrepancy between what one wants in a job and what one has in a job. Further, the theory states that how much one values a given facet of work (e.g. the degree of autonomy in a position) moderates how satisfied/dissatisfied one becomes when expectations are/are not met. When a person values a particular facet of a job, their satisfaction is more greatly impacted both positively (when expectations are met) and negatively (when expectations are not met), compared to one who does not value that facet.

To illustrate, if Employee A values autonomy in the workplace and Employee B is indifferent about autonomy, then Employee A would be more satisfied in a position that offers a high degree of autonomy and less satisfied in a position with little or no autonomy compared to Employee B. This theory also states that too much of a particular facet will produce stronger feelings of dissatisfaction the more a worker values that facet.

=== Dispositional approach ===
The dispositional approach suggests that individuals vary in their tendency to be satisfied with their jobs, in other words, job satisfaction is to some extent an individual trait. This approach became a notable explanation of job satisfaction in light of evidence that job satisfaction tends to be stable over time and across careers and jobs. Research also indicates that identical twins raised apart have similar levels of job satisfaction.

A significant model that narrowed the scope of the dispositional approach was the Core Self-evaluations Model, proposed by Timothy A. Judge, Edwin A. Locke, and Cathy C. Durham in 1997. Judge et al. argued that there are four core self-evaluations that determine one's disposition towards job satisfaction: self-esteem, general self-efficacy, locus of control, and neuroticism. This model states that higher levels of self-esteem (the value one places on oneself) and general self-efficacy (the belief in one's own competence) lead to higher work satisfaction. Having an internal locus of control (believing one has control over one's own life, as opposed to outside forces having control) leads to higher job satisfaction. Finally, lower levels of neuroticism lead to higher job satisfaction.

=== Equity theory ===
Equity Theory shows how a person views fairness in regard to social relationships such as with an employer. A person identifies the amount of input (things gained) from a relationship compared to the output (things given) to produce an input/output ratio. They then compare this ratio to the ratio of other people in deciding whether they have an equitable relationship. Equity Theory suggests that if an individual thinks there is an inequality between two social groups or individuals, the person is likely to be distressed because the ratio between the input and the output are not equal.

For example, consider two employees who work the same job and receive the same pay and benefits. If one individual gets a pay raise for doing the same work as the other, then the less benefited individual will become distressed in the workplace. If, on the other hand, both individuals get pay raises and new responsibilities, then the feeling of equity will be maintained.

Other psychologists have extended the equity theory, suggesting three behavioral response patterns to situations of perceived equity or inequity. These three types are benevolent, equity sensitive, and entitled. The level by each type affects motivation, job satisfaction, and job performance.

1. Benevolent-Satisfied when they are under-rewarded compared with co-workers
2. Equity sensitive-Believe everyone should be fairly rewarded
3. Entitled-People believe that everything they receive is their just due

=== Discrepancy theory ===
The concept of discrepancy theory is to explain the ultimate source of anxiety and dejection. An individual who has not fulfilled their responsibilities may feel a sense of anxiety and regret for not performing well. They may also feel dejection due to not being able to achieve their hopes and aspirations.

According to this theory, all individuals will learn what their obligations and responsibilities are for a particular function, and if they fail to fulfill those obligations then they are punished. Over time, these duties and obligations consolidate to form an abstracted set of principles, designated as a self-guide. Agitation and anxiety are the main responses when an individual fails to achieve the obligation or responsibility. This theory also explains that if achievement of the obligations is obtained then the reward can be praise, approval, or love. These achievements and aspirations also form an abstracted set of principles, referred to as the ideal self guide. When the individual fails to obtain these rewards, they begin to have feelings of dejection, disappointment, or even depression.

=== Two-factor theory (motivator-hygiene theory) ===
Frederick Herzberg's two-factor theory (also known as motivator-hygiene theory) attempts to explain satisfaction and motivation in the workplace. This theory states that satisfaction and dissatisfaction are driven by different factors – motivation and hygiene factors, respectively. An employee's motivation to work is continually related to job satisfaction of a subordinate. Motivation can be seen as an inner force that drives individuals to attain personal and organizational goals. Motivating factors are those aspects of the job that make people want to perform, and provide people with satisfaction, for example achievement in work, recognition, promotion opportunities. These motivating factors are considered to be intrinsic to the job, or the work carried out. Hygiene factors include aspects of the working environment such as pay, company policies, supervisory practices, and other working conditions.

Herzberg's model has stimulated much research. In the 1970s, researchers were unable to reliably empirically prove the model however, with Hackman & Oldham suggesting that Herzberg's original formulation of the model may have been a methodological artifact.

The theory has been criticized because it does not consider individual differences, conversely predicting all employees will react in an identical manner to changes in motivating/hygiene factors. The model has also been criticised in that it does not specify how motivating/hygiene factors are to be measured. Most studies use a quantitative approach by for example using validated instruments such as the Minnesota Satisfaction Questionnaire. There are also studies that have utilized a qualitative methodology such as by means of individual interviews.

=== Job characteristics model ===
Hackman & Oldham proposed the job characteristics model, which is widely used as a framework to study how particular job characteristics impact job outcomes, including job satisfaction. The five core job characteristics can be combined to form a motivating potential score (MPS) for a job, which can be used as an index of how likely a job is to affect an employee's attitudes and behaviors. Not everyone is equally affected by the MPS of a job. People who are high in growth need strength (the desire for autonomy, challenge and development of new skills on the job) are particularly affected by job characteristics. A meta-analysis of studies that assess the framework of the model provides some support for the validity of the JCM.

== Influencing factors ==
=== Environmental factors ===
==== Communication overload and underload ====
One of the most important aspects of an individual's work in a modern organization concerns the management of communication demands that they encounter on the job. Demands can be characterized as a communication load, which refers to "the rate and complexity of communication inputs an individual must process in a particular time frame."

Individuals in an organization can experience communication overload and communication underload, which can affect their level of job satisfaction. Communication overload can occur when "an individual receives too many messages in a short period of time," resulting in unprocessed information or when an individual faces more complex messages that are more difficult to process. Due to this process, "given an individual's style of work and motivation to complete a task, when more inputs exist than outputs, the individual perceives a condition of overload," which can be positively or negatively related to job satisfaction. In comparison, communication underload can occur when messages or inputs are sent below the individual's ability to process them.

According to the ideas of communication overload and underload, if an individual does not receive enough input on the job or is unsuccessful in processing these inputs, the individual is more likely to become dissatisfied, aggravated, and unhappy with their work, leading to a low level of job satisfaction.

==== Superior-subordinate communication ====
Superior-subordinate communication is an important influence on job satisfaction in the workplace. The way in which subordinates perceive a supervisor's behavior can positively or negatively influence job satisfaction. Communication behavior such as facial expression, eye contact, vocal expression, and body movement is crucial to the superior-subordinate relationship. Nonverbal messages play a central role in interpersonal interactions with respect to impression formation, deception, attraction, social influence, and emotion. Nonverbal immediacy from the supervisor helps to increase interpersonal involvement with their subordinates, impacting job satisfaction. The manner in which supervisors communicate with their subordinates nonverbally may be more important than the verbal content. Individuals who dislike and think negatively about their supervisor are less willing to communicate or have motivation to work, whereas individuals who like and think positively of their supervisor are more likely to communicate and are satisfied with their job and work environment. A supervisor who uses nonverbal immediacy, friendliness, and open communication lines is more likely to receive positive feedback and high job satisfaction from a subordinate. Conversely, a supervisor who is antisocial, unfriendly, and unwilling to communicate will naturally receive negative feedback and create low job satisfaction in their subordinates.

=== Strategic employee recognition ===
A Watson Wyatt Worldwide study identified a positive outcome between a collegial and flexible work environment and an increase in shareholder value. Suggesting that employee satisfaction is directly related to financial gain. Over 40 percent of the companies listed in the top 100 of Fortune magazine's "America's Best Companies to Work For" also appear on the Fortune 500. It is possible that successful workers enjoy working at successful companies, however, the Watson Wyatt Worldwide Human Capital Index study claims that effective human resources practices, such as employee recognition programs, lead to positive financial outcomes more often than positive financial outcomes lead to good practices.

Employee recognition is not only about gifts and points. It's about changing the corporate culture in order to meet goals and initiatives and most importantly to connect employees to the company's core values and beliefs. Strategic employee recognition is seen as the most important program not only to improve employee retention and motivation but also to positively influence the financial situation. The difference between the traditional approach (gifts and points) and strategic recognition is the ability to serve as a serious business influencer that can advance a company's strategic objectives in a measurable way. "The vast majority of companies want to be innovative, coming up with new products, business models and better ways of doing things. However, innovation is not so easy to achieve. A CEO cannot just order it, and so it will be. You have to carefully manage an organization so that, over time, innovations will emerge."

=== Individual factors ===
==== Emotion ====
Mood and emotions at work are related to job satisfaction. Moods tend to be longer lasting but often weaker states of uncertain origin, while emotions are often more intense, short-lived and have a clear object or cause.

Some research suggests moods are related to overall job satisfaction. Positive and negative emotions were also found to be significantly related to overall job satisfaction.

Frequency of experiencing net positive emotion will be a better predictor of overall job satisfaction than will intensity of positive emotion when it is experienced.

Emotion work (or emotion management) refers to various types of efforts to manage emotional states and displays. Emotion management includes all of the conscious and unconscious efforts to increase, maintain, or decrease one or more components of an emotion. Although early studies of the consequences of emotional work emphasized its harmful effects on workers, studies of workers in a variety of occupations suggest that the consequences of emotional work are not uniformly negative.

It was found that suppression of unpleasant emotions decreases job satisfaction and the amplification of pleasant emotions increases job satisfaction.

The understanding of how emotion regulation relates to job satisfaction concerns two models:

1. Emotional dissonance: a state of discrepancy between public displays of emotions and internal experiences of emotions, that often follows the process of emotion regulation. Emotional dissonance is associated with high emotional exhaustion, low organizational commitment, and low job satisfaction.
2. Social interaction model: taking the social interaction perspective, workers' emotion regulation might beget responses from others during interpersonal encounters that subsequently impact their own job satisfaction. For example, the accumulation of favorable responses to displays of pleasant emotions might positively affect job satisfaction.

==== Genetics ====
The influence that genetics has had on a variety of individual differences is well documented. Some research suggests genetics also play a role in the intrinsic, direct experiences of job satisfaction like challenge or achievement (as opposed to extrinsic, environmental factors like working conditions). Notably, Arvey et al. (1989) examined job satisfaction in 34 pairs of monozygotic twins who were reared apart to test for the existence of genetic influence on job satisfaction. After correcting for age and gender, they obtained an intra-class correlation of .31. This suggests that 31% of variance in job satisfaction has a genetic basis, the estimate would be slightly larger if corrected for measurement error. They also found that evidence of genetic heritability for job characteristics, such as complexity level, motor skill requirements, and physical demands.

==== Personality ====
Some research suggests an association between personality and job satisfaction. Specifically, this research describes the role of negative affectivity and positive affectivity. Negative affectivity is related strongly to the personality trait of neuroticism. Individuals high in negative affectivity are more prone to experience less job satisfaction. Positive affectivity is related strongly to the personality trait of extraversion. Those high in positive affectivity are more prone to be satisfied in most dimensions of their life, including their job. Differences in affectivity likely impact how individuals will perceive objective job circumstances like pay and working conditions, thus affecting their satisfaction in that job.

There are two personality factors related to job satisfaction, alienation and locus of control. Employees who have an internal locus of control and feel less alienated are more likely to experience job satisfaction, job involvement and organizational commitment. A meta-analysis of 187 studies of job satisfaction concluded that high satisfaction was positively associated with an internal locus of control. The study also showed characteristics like high Machiavellianism, narcissism, trait anger, type A personality dimensions of achievement striving and impatience/irritability, are also related to job satisfaction.

=== Psychological well-being ===
Psychological well-being (PWB) is defined as "the overall effectiveness of an individual's psychological functioning" as related to primary facets of one's life: work, family, community, etc. There are three defining characteristics of PWB. First, it is a phenomenological event, meaning that people are happy when they subjectively believe themselves to be so. Second, well-being involves some emotional conditions. Particularly, psychologically well people are more prone to experience positive emotions and less prone to experience negative emotions. Third, well-being refers to one's life as a whole. It is a global evaluation. PWB is primarily measured using the eight-item Index of Psychological Well-Being developed by Berkman (IPWB). IPWB asks respondents to reply to a series a questions on how often they felt "pleased about accomplishing something", "bored", "depressed or unhappy", etc.

PWB in the workplace plays an important role in determining job satisfaction and has attracted much research attention in recent years. These studies have focused on the effects of PWB on job satisfaction as well as job performance. One study noted that because job satisfaction is specific to one's job, the research that examined job satisfaction had not taken into account aspects of one's life external to the job. Prior studies had focused only on the work environment as the main determinant of job satisfaction. Ultimately, to better understand job satisfaction (and its close relative, job performance), it is important to take into account an individual's PWB. Research published in 2000 showed a significant correlation between PWB and job satisfaction (r = .35, p < .01). A follow-up study by the same authors in 2007 revealed similar results (r = .30, p < .01). In addition, these studies show that PWB is a better predictor of job performance than job satisfaction alone. Job satisfaction more associate to mental health than physical health.

== Measuring ==
The majority of job satisfaction measures are self-reports and based on multi-item scales. Several measures have been developed over the years, although they vary in terms of how carefully and distinctively they are conceptualized with respect to affective or cognitive job satisfaction. They also vary in terms of the extent and rigour of their psychometric validation.

The Brief Index of Affective Job Satisfaction (BIAJS) is a four-item, overtly affective as opposed to cognitive, measure of overall affective job satisfaction. The BIAJS differs from other job satisfaction measures in being comprehensively validated not just for internal consistency reliability, temporal stability, convergent and criterion-related validities, but also for cross-population invariance by nationality, job level, and job type. Reported internal consistency reliabilities range between 0.81 and 0.87.

The Job Descriptive Index (JDI) is a specifically cognitive job satisfaction measure. It measures one's satisfaction in five facets: pay, promotions and promotion opportunities, coworkers, supervision, and the work itself. The scale is simple, participants answer either yes, no, or can't decide (indicated by '?') in response to whether given statements accurately describe one's job.

The Job Satisfaction Survey (JSS) measures satisfaction with nine facets: Pay, Promotion, Supervision, Fringe Benefits, Contingent Rewards, Operating Procedures, Coworkers, Nature of Work, and Communication.

The Michigan Organizational Assessment Questionnaire job satisfaction subscale is a 3-item measure of general job satisfaction. It has been very popular with researchers.

The Minnesota Satisfaction Questionnaire (MSQ) has 20 facets plus intrinsic and extrinsic satisfaction scores. There are long and short forms.

The Short Index of Job Satisfaction (SIJS) is a free five-item measure which provides overall attitudinal job satisfaction scores. It derived from the Index of Job Satisfaction (IJS) which originally had 18 items. The SIJS presented good validity evidence based on the internal structure (i.e., dimensionality, reliability of the scores, and measurement invariance among sex and countries) as also good validity evidence based on the relation to other variables (e.g., US samples, Brazilian and Portuguese samples).

== Relationships and practical implications ==
Job satisfaction can be indicative of work behaviors such as organizational citizenship, and withdrawal behaviors such as absenteeism, and turnover. Further, job satisfaction can partially mediate the relationship of personality variables and deviant work behaviors. The most important predictor of job satisfaction was perceived organizational support, followed by organizational health. Research shows that staying healthy boosts a person's mindset, which influences job satisfaction. Moreover, a corporate wellness program can positively shape how employees feel about their work environment and office conditions. Positive psychological capital was also predicted by organizational health, which was highly related to work satisfaction. Empirical research in software engineering has shown that higher job satisfaction is strongly related to lower turnover intentions.

One common research finding is that job satisfaction is correlated with life satisfaction. This correlation is reciprocal, meaning people who are satisfied with life tend to be satisfied with their job and people who are satisfied with their job tend to be satisfied with life. In fact, a 2016 FlexJobs survey revealed 97% of respondents believe a job that offered flexibility would positively impact their lives, 87% think it would help lower stress and 79% think the flexibility would help them live healthier. Additionally, a second survey of 650 working parents revealed that flexible work arrangements can positively affect people's personal health, as well as improve their romantic relationships and 99% of respondents believe a flexible job would make them a happier person in general. However, some research has found that job satisfaction is not significantly related to life satisfaction when other variables such as nonwork satisfaction and core self-evaluations are taken into account.

An important finding for organizations to note is that job satisfaction has a rather tenuous correlation to productivity on the job. This is a vital piece of information to researchers and businesses, as the idea that satisfaction and job performance are directly related to one another is often cited in the media and in some non-academic management literature. A recent meta-analysis found surprisingly low correlations between job satisfaction and performance. Further, the meta-analysis found that the relationship between satisfaction and performance can be moderated by job complexity, such that for high-complexity jobs the correlation between satisfaction and performance is higher than for jobs of low to moderate complexity. Additionally, one longitudinal study indicated that among work attitudes, job satisfaction is a strong predictor of absenteeism, suggesting that increasing job satisfaction and organizational commitment are potentially good strategies for reducing absenteeism and turnover intentions. Recent research has also shown that intention to quit alone can have negative effects on performance, organizational deviance, and organizational citizenship behaviours. In short, the relationship of satisfaction to productivity is not as straightforward as often assumed and can be influenced by a number of different work-related constructs, and the notion that "a happy worker is a productive worker" should not be the foundation of organizational decision-making. For example, employee personality may even be more important than job satisfaction in regards to performance. Job satisfaction has also been found to be impacting the shorter job tenure among persons with severe mental illness.

== Absenteeism ==
Numerous studies have been done to show the correlation of job satisfaction and absenteeism. For example, Goldberg and Waldman looked at absenteeism in two dimensions as total time lost (number of missed days) and the frequency of time lost.

Self-reported data and records-based data were collected and compared. Following absenteeism measures were evaluated according to absenteeism predictors.

1. Self-report time lost
2. self-reported frequency
3. records-based time lost

Only three categories of predictors had a significant relationship ratio and were taken in account further:

- Health
- Wages
- Position level

This research results revealed that absenteeism cannot be predicted by job satisfaction, although other studies have found significant relationships.

== See also ==
- Critique of work
- Bullshit job
- Decent work
- Employee morale
- Happiness at work
- Honeymoon-hangover effect
- Industrial and organizational psychology
- Labor rights
- Onboarding
- Organizational justice
- Personality-Job Fit Theory
- Person-environment fit
- Quality of working life
- Stigma management
