= Induction training =

Introduction to an organisation for new employees

In human resource development, induction training introduces new employees to their new profession or job role, within an organisation. As a form of systematic training, induction training familiarises and assists new employees with their employer, workforce and job design. The scale of induction training varies between organisations, with smaller firms typically conducting induction in the early months of employment, in comparison to larger corporations who dedicate greater time and resources to its completion.

== Process of induction training ==
Training can be systematic or unsystematic training. Induction training is systematic training. The systematic model supplements natural learning with a systematic intervention that relates to the organisation's objectives. The features of induction training include:

- Training is part of the organisation's overall planning process and is in line with its goals.
- The organisation has a training strategy which shapes the approach to employee development.
- Skills are planned for and addressed systematically through formal training.
- There is a continuous cycle of training analysis, activity and evaluation.

In small organisations, the responsibility for carrying out the induction training usually rests with one person. In larger organisations, the responsibility is shared between managers, supervisors and human resources. In the case of both big and small organisations the employees and his/her, senior manager play a major role in inducting an employee. Their responsibility is to ensure that the induction program is followed and the desired induction goals are achieved. During the Induction, the human resources are responsible for preparing the induction checklist (updating periodically), the planning and administration of the formal program, assisting and advising employees

The induction itself is usually conducted within the workplace by competent trainers and speakers in a presentation format. Induction training can also be in a written format, which can be sent to a new employee before they start, or handed to them when they start or delivered as a computer-based format.

== Effective induction training ==
The induction is the first real opportunity new employees get to experience their new employer. If for example the trainer is no good or the facilitation lacks, new employees may quickly become bored and may even question their choice of employment. Induction training must be comprehensive, collaborative, systematic and coherent to be effective and make a positive impact with the trainee. According to TPI-theory, training should include development of theoretical and practical skills, but also meet interaction needs that exist among the new employees. There are different ways in which different businesses conduct induction training in order to enable new staff and recruits to do their work. I.e. Starbucks, who ensure their induction is very practical to set the expectations of the job compared to the Exxonmobil Graduate schemes program which spans the first year of employment, with the bulk of the induction training happening in the first two weeks to ensure they have built up the background knowledge before learning about job or role particular training. The right balance of training will not be too intensive an information-giving session as this will be ineffective as individuals will start to lose concentration and may end up missing crucial information.

=== Objectives of induction training ===
The primary goal of induction training is to facilitate employees' smooth entry into the organisation. The goals of induction training are in line with those of the wider induction process, and include:

- Creating a positive atmosphere
- Addressing any new job concerns
- Increasing comfort level and feeling of belonging
- Increasing knowledge of the organisation and its procedures & policies
- Sharing organisational values
- Sharing job specific information
- Improving staff morale and corporate culture.

After induction training is complete, the employee should know the requirements of the particular task they will perform within the organisation and be successfully integrated into the specific area in which their work will be performed.

== Alternatives to induction training ==
An alternative to Induction training is coaching. Coaching is a partnership in which employees aim to achieve support and advice from a more senior colleague whilst on the job. Staff Retreats is another form of introduction for new employees. Businesses pause once or twice a year to analyse policies and procedures and also look through their systems and processes. The main objective is looking at ways to improve efficiency of their business. On the job training is also an alternative to induction training and is given to an employee at their workplace while they are doing the job. Group discussions are another possible alternative for induction training. Group discussions are informal gatherings of individuals in order to discuss ideas and information while suggesting how new recruits can cope with the new environment.

== Induction training during a pandemic ==
With the rise of a global pandemic, it has been essential to mitigate risk and face-to-face contact points for almost every business. Many businesses have turned to using online inductions, which make it safer for all parties involved in the induction process whilst maintaining productivity.

These moves to online based inductions are proving to be a permanent shift in working practices. Early adopters of online inductions have been at an advantage as they are set up ready to update their inductions with Covid-19 information quickly.

== Benefits ==
The induction process familiarises new employees with the business and the people. Induction training enables a new recruit to become productive as quickly as possible. The cost of not training is considered higher than the cost of training. The main advantage of induction training is that it can be brief and informative allowing businesses to save time and money on planning and conducting the training whilst supplying key information to new entrants. Induction training ensure staff are equipped with the necessary skills, motivation and capacity for productivity to achieve organisational goals. Induction training also helps to provide individuals with a professional impression of the company and its aims and objectives allowing new entrants to work towards these aims and exceed them.
