= Situation =

Situation and its derivations may refer to:

== Situation ==
=== Common uses ===
- A concept similar to scenario, relating to a position (location) or a set of circumstances.
- A job

=== People ===
- The Situation (TV personality), nickname of American reality TV personality Michael Sorrentino

=== Arts, entertainment, and media ===
==== Film ====
- The Situation (film), a 2006 film

==== Music ====
- Situation (album), a 2007 album by Canadian musician Buck 65
- Situation (song), a 1982 song by British new wave band Yazoo
- "Situation", a 2024 song by A Little Sound; an interpolation of the 2000 Sugababes single "Overload"
- "Situation", a song by Godsmack from their eponymous album
- "The Situation", a song by The Black Eyed Peas from the album The Beginning

==== Television ====
- Situation comedy, abbreviated sitcom, a type of television show
- "The Situation" (Parenthood), a 2010 episode
- The Situation, the former name of the MSNBC show Tucker

=== Other uses ===
- Situation (Sartre), a concept by Jean-Paul Sartre
- Rhetorical situation, the context of a rhetorical event
- Situation awareness, the perception of environmental elements and events
- Situation report, abbreviated sitrep
- Ástandið, or "The Situation" in English, the occupation of Iceland by Allied troops during World War II.

== Situated ==
- Situated, located
- Situated cognition, a theory that posits that knowing is inseparable from doing

== Situationism ==
- Situationism (psychology), which holds that personality is more influenced by external factors than by internal traits or motivations
- Situationism, the ideas of Situationist International, an international political and artistic movement of the 1960s
- Sitationism, in situational ethics, the idea in ethics that the morality of an act is a function of the state of the system when, or context where it occurs
