= Honeymoon-hangover effect =

Concept in organisational psychology

In organisational psychology, the honeymoon-hangover effect describes the relationship between voluntary employee job change and job satisfaction. The first stage of the honeymoon hangover effect is referred to as “deterioration”, in which employees experience job dissatisfaction and leave their old job. Immediately after changing jobs, there is a sudden increase in job satisfaction at the new job (honeymoon effect). This increase in job satisfaction is followed by a slower decline in job satisfaction back to a baseline level (hangover effect).

The existence of the honeymoon-hangover effect is supported by some studies, but there is also conflicting evidence. Some researchers have proposed potential causes of the honeymoon-hangover effect. There is also evidence to suggest that certain intrinsic and extrinsic factors affect the extent to which an individual experiences this effect.

== Theoretical background ==
The honeymoon-hangover effect was first hypothesized and discovered in 2005 by Wendy R. Boswell and co-authors. The authors’ speculation of the effect was based on prior findings. When an individual voluntarily changes jobs, their level of job satisfaction follows a curvilinear pattern. There is an initial peak after which satisfaction slowly declines. It can be separated into three main stages: deterioration, honeymoon, and hangover.

=== Deterioration ===
Deterioration refers to the decline in job satisfaction prior to leaving a job. Previous research established that job satisfaction was related to employee turnover. For example, one meta-analysis found that there was a correlation of -0.19 between job satisfaction and employee turnover. The authors also discussed how job satisfaction may mediate the relationship between job attributes and turnover. This prior research informed the first hypothesis (deterioration) in the seminal paper by Boswell and co-authors, which states:

“Turnover at a given point in time (t) is likely to be preceded by dissatisfaction at an earlier point in time (t − 1).”

=== Honeymoon ===
The honeymoon effect refers to the increase in job satisfaction and work ability when starting a new job. Further examination of prior literature motivated the authors' second hypothesis, which they termed the honeymoon effect. They discussed previous studies which found evidence to support the idea that job satisfaction is likely to increase when starting a job. Specifically, some findings had shown that organizations “typically present their most favourable side to individuals during recruitment”. The honeymoon effect was termed as a period after the initial job induction where the relationship between the employer and employee was "temporally shielded from unfavorable outcomes in the job or organizational role". These findings led the authors to propose the second hypothesis which states:

“A voluntary job change will be met with an increase in job satisfaction, which we term the honeymoon effect.”

Some studies have also argued that irreversible and voluntary job transitions are likely to stimulate a desire to perceive the new job in a positive light. When engaging in sense-making of the new organisation, new employees use their previous job as a frame of reference to appraise their new job. They may further infer attractive aspects about their new job by “filling in the blanks related to missing information” related to good jobs. Boswell and co-authors noted in their seminal paper that new hires feel heightened job satisfaction when entering these novel circumstances, and termed this the honeymoon effect.

=== Hangover ===
Further analysis of other research provoked the authors to hypothesise the hangover effect. It had been found previously that as employees spend more time in their new job, they gain more knowledge about their job. This increased knowledge (which is likely to be more accurate and less figural) reduces the attractiveness of the job. These findings, combined with others, led the authors to propose the third hypothesis which states:

“The honeymoon effect will be followed by a decline in job satisfaction, which we term the hangover effect."

The hangover effect may relate to the idea of employees returning to a 'set-point', that is a dispositional mood level around which reactions fluctuate. This is especially pronounced after a stimulating life change such as a job switch. Also notable is the idea of ‘affective habituation’ which occurs when employees take part in mundane job activities and experience normalisation, affecting their job satisfaction negatively.

== Causes ==
=== Sources of pain ===
Psychological theories of how the honeymoon hangover effect manifests have been posited. In one study, 16 workers who had left their previous job in the past 30 months were interviewed and transcripts were analysed. The resulting theory suggested that the honeymoon effect is a result of the new job being able to remedy sources of “pain” inflicted in the previous job. Because of this myopic focus on the remedy of pain, other factors that could potentially cause job dissatisfaction in the future are discounted. When these other factors are realized, individuals may then experience job dissatisfaction (the hangover effect).

=== Patterns of anxiety, depression, and anger ===
A study observed patterns of anxiety and depression associated with the transition from employment to self employment. Employees found an improvement in their work-related anxiety and depression levels shortly following job change (honeymoon effect). However, after some time, a rise was observed yet again, signifying the hangover effect.

== Supporting evidence ==
One study examined patterns of job satisfaction experienced by 132 new employees by collecting data on job satisfaction at 4 different time points. The study showed that employees experienced a honeymoon-hangover pattern of job satisfaction, in which satisfaction peaked after job entry and decreased afterwards.

One study analysed data from the German Socioeconomic panel survey, which includes data on 10,000 households on variables including subjective well-being and employment. Statistical analyses were conducted on the data which led the researchers to conclude that the term honeymoon-hangover was a good description of the pattern of job satisfaction observed. This study also showed that this pattern of job satisfaction was only seen after voluntary job change, which is consistent with the honeymoon-hangover effect hypothesis.

Furthermore, the effect was observed when analysing data from a cohort study of older employees in Germany. In particular, young and female employees were most represented amongst the group of employees who voluntarily changed employers. Employees with low to medium vocational education and physical work also changed voluntarily. Lastly, employees with lower income levels, a partner and better physical health changed more frequently.

The effect has further been expanded to changes in work ability after voluntary job changes. Increases in work ability were observed amongst a cohort study of elder German employees, constituting a honeymoon effect. Following this, ability to work declined over time when participants stayed with the same employer.

The effect is also dependent on time intervals between the deterioration, honeymoon, and hangover stages. The original paper found that deterioration lasted up to two years before the employer change. The honeymoon period lasted a year after the job change, and a hangover followed one year after. In terms of work ability, the honeymoon effect was seen immediately.

== Conflicting evidence ==
One study looked at how the emotions and feelings of new police recruits changed during the job adjustment period. This study reported that happiness didn’t change significantly throughout the process, whilst levels of anger and anxiety increased. The authors report that these findings “highlight the importance of examining changes in newcomers' felt emotions, as they exhibit a different pattern from the honeymoon-hangover effect”. Despite this, the authors note that increases in anger and anxiety found could explain the hangover effect.

== Factors influencing the honeymoon-hangover effect ==
Evidence suggests that certain factors influence whether an individual experiences a honeymoon-hangover pattern of job satisfaction and to what extent. For example, personality, overeducation, positive initial experiences, occupational mobility, and attitudes towards the previous job.

=== Personality ===
Some research has indicated that certain personality traits are associated with the honeymoon-hangover effect. One study analysed data on 1553 individuals in South Korea and found that extroverts had higher job satisfaction at the start of a new job compared to introverts. This study also found that the hangover effect was stronger for extroverted newcomers.

=== Overeducation ===
Overeducation refers to a situation where the level of formal education an employee has is above the level required for the current occupation. One study analysed data on 30,000 respondents from the Socioeconomic panel. The study aimed to uncover how the match between education and job affects job satisfaction during a job change. The results showed that the extent of overeducation in the old and new job impacts the strength of the honeymoon and hangover effects. The study concluded that the honeymoon effect is stronger for individuals who move from a job in which they were overeducated to a job in which their level of education better matches their job. The hangover effect was also weaker for these individuals. This study further found that individuals who move into jobs which match their education to a lesser extent experience no honeymoon effect.

=== Positive initial experiences ===
Initial positive experiences in a new job can typify the honeymoon-hangover effect. It was found that if newcomers perceived the organization to be fulfilling commitments, a honeymoon-hangover pattern was found concerning their job satisfaction. However, newcomers who did not perceive the organization to be fulfilling commitments did not experience a honeymoon-hangover pattern of job satisfaction. Instead, for these individuals, job satisfaction remained the same throughout the job-change process.

Furthermore, it was found newcomers who reported feeling more socialized in new jobs experienced a honeymoon-hangover pattern of job satisfaction. Newcomers who didn’t report feeling socialized in a new job instead experienced a consistent decline in job satisfaction, with no honeymoon or hangover effect.

=== Occupational mobility ===
Occupational mobility is any job change which requires moving across different occupational boundaries. It is directional. Upwards mobility signifies higher economic and intrinsic rewards. Conversely, downwards mobility leads to adverse effects on an individual's wellbeing and is a major source of job dissatisfaction. One longitudinal study hypothesised that the direction of occupational mobility would affect the extent to which job satisfaction increased or decreased after turnover. Further hypotheses speculated that an increase or decrease in satisfaction would dissipate over time. The sample consisted of employees aged 18 to 65, drawing on data from the British Household Panel Survey. The study found that heightened occupational mobility was associated with a 'honeymoon effect' at the time of turnover. This effect was not observed for those experiencing downward mobility.

=== Attitudes towards the prior job ===
The honeymoon effect is hypothesised to be more notable in cases where individuals have particularly negative feelings about their previous jobs. This may lead them to hold high hopes for their new job, causing a contrast effect between the previous and present job. This facilitates a heightened honeymoon effect, as well as a subsequent decline in job satisfaction after normalisation occurs. In contrast, individuals with high job satisfaction in their previous role did not reveal such an effect.
