= Person–environment fit =

Compatibility of characteristics

Person–environment fit (P–E fit) is the degree to which individual and environmental characteristics match. Person characteristics may include an individual's biological or psychological needs, values, goals, abilities, or personality, while environmental characteristics could include intrinsic and extrinsic rewards, demands of a job or role, cultural values, or characteristics of other individuals and collectives in the person's social environment. Due to its important implications in the workplace, person–environment fit has maintained a prominent position in Industrial and organizational psychology and related fields.

Person–environment fit can be understood as a specific type of person–situation interaction that involves the match between corresponding person and environment dimensions. Even though person–situation interactions as they relate to fit have been discussed in the scientific literature for decades, the field has yet to reach consensus on how to conceptualize and operationalize person–environment fit. This is due partly to the fact that person–environment fit encompasses a number of subsets, such as person–supervisor fit and person–job fit, which are conceptually distinct from one another. There has been a long debate about the relative importance of the person versus the situation in terming human behavior. One group researchers have argued that it is the situation which primarily responsible for individual behaviors, while another group of searchers believe that the personal characteristics are primary responsible for behavior. Nevertheless, it is generally assumed that person–environment fit leads to positive outcomes, such as satisfaction, performance, and overall well-being.

== Domains ==
=== Person–organization fit ===
Person–organization fit (P–O fit) is the most widely studied area of person–environment fit, and is defined by Kristof (1996) as, "the compatibility between people and organizations that occurs when (a) at least one entity provides what the other needs, (b) they share similar fundamental characteristics, or (c) both". High value congruence is a large facet of person–organization fit, which implies a strong culture and shared values among coworkers. This can translate to increased levels of trust and a shared sense of corporate community. This high value congruence would in turn reap benefits for the organization itself, including reduced turnover, increased citizenship behaviors, and organizational commitment. The attraction–selection–attrition theory states that individuals are attracted to and seek to work for organizations where they perceive high levels of person–organization fit. A strong person–organization fit can also lead to reduced turnover and increased organizational citizenship behaviors. Jaskeviciute et al. (2024) studied the effect of P-O fit on three types of well-being (life well-being, workplace well-being and psychological well-being) and found that it has statistically significant positive effects on all three well-being constructs.

=== Person–job fit ===
Person–job fit, or P–J fit, refers to the compatibility between a person's characteristics and those of a specific job. The complementary perspective has been the foundation for person–job fit. This includes the traditional view of selection that emphasizes the matching of employee KSAs and other qualities to job demands. The discrepancy models of job satisfaction and stress that focus on employees' needs and desires being met by the supplies provided by their job.

=== Person–group fit ===
Person–group fit, or P–G fit, is a relatively new topic with regard to person–environment fit. Since person–group fit is so new, limited research has been conducted to demonstrate how the psychological compatibility between coworkers influences individual outcomes in group situations. However, person–group fit is most strongly related to group-oriented outcomes like co-worker satisfaction and feelings of cohesion.

=== Person–person fit ===
Person–person fit is conceptualized as the fit between an individual's culture preferences and those preferences of others. It corresponds to the similarity-attraction hypothesis which states people are drawn to similar others based on their values, attitudes, and opinions. The most studied types are mentors and protégés, supervisors and subordinates, or even applicants and recruiters. Research has shown that person–supervisor fit is most strongly related to supervisor-oriented outcomes like supervisor satisfaction.

=== Person–skill fit ===
Person–skill fit, or PS-Fit, is defined as the fit between a set of required skills of internal/external workers and a variety of diverse tasks that should be performed by the organization in new work environments. The person–skill fit model is specifically relevant for firms that seek to improve their dynamic alignment with new forms of work resulting from recent changes in labor market, such as Gig Work, Freelancer work, Temporary work, International organization work and Remote work that was boosted during the COVID-19 pandemic. PS-Fit aims at helping organizations in their efforts to transition from conventional management practices to new management implementations to achieve improved outcomes in modern dynamic environments.

== Antecedents ==
=== Training and development ===
Training and development on the job can be used to update or enhance skills or knowledge so employees are more in tune with the requirements and demands of their jobs, or to prepare them to make the transition into new ones. Training can be used as a socialization method, or as a way of making the employee aware of the organization's desired values, which would aid in increasing person–organization fit. As people learn about the organization they are working for through either company-initiated or self-initiated socialization, they should be able to be more accurate in their appraisal of fit or misfit. Furthermore, there is evidence that employees come to identify with their organization over time by mirroring its values, and socialization is a critical part of this process.

=== Performance appraisal ===
In the workplace, performance appraisal and recognition or rewards can be used to stimulate skill-building and knowledge enhancement, which would thereby enhance person–job fit. Expanding upon this notion, Cable and Judge (1994) showed that compensation systems have a direct effect on job search decisions, and additionally, the effects of compensation systems on job search decisions are strengthened when the applicant's personality characteristics fit with the various components of the compensation system. When an employer's aim is to strengthen person–organization fit, they can use performance appraisal to focus on an employee's value and goal congruence, and ensure the individual's goals are in line with the company's goals.

On a group-level, organizations could evaluate the achievement of a group or team goal. Recognizing and supporting this achievement would build trust in the idea that everyone is contributing to the collective for the greater good, and aid in increasing person–group fit.

=== Attraction–selection–attrition processes ===
Schneider (1987) proposed attraction–selection–attrition (ASA) model which addresses how attraction, selection and attrition could generate high levels of fit in an organization. The model is based on the proposition that it is the collective characteristics that define an organization. As a result, through the ASA process, organizations become more homogeneous with respect to people in them.

The attraction process of the model explains how employees find organizations attractive when they see congruence between characteristics of themselves and values of the organizations. The next step in ASA process is formal or informal selection procedures used by the organization during recruitment and hiring of applicants that fit the organization.

From the employee life cycle, recruitment and selection are the first stages that are taken into account when considering person–environment fit. The complementary model would posit that selection processes may work in part to select individuals whose values are compatible with the values of the organization, and screening out those whose values are incompatible. Additionally, in accordance with supplementary fit models, an applicant will seek out and apply to organizations that they feel represent the values that he or she may have. This theory is exemplified through a study by Bretz and Judge (1994), which found that individuals who scored high on team orientation measures were likely to pick an organization that had good work–family policies in place. Along this same vein, when job searching, applicants will look for job characteristics such as the amount of participation they will have, autonomy, and the overall design of the job. These characteristics are shown to be significantly and positively related to person–organization and person–job fit, which is positively associated the measurement of job satisfaction one year after entry.

The last process in ASA model is attrition, which outlines that the misfitting employee would be more likely to make errors once hired, and therefore leave the organization. Thus, the people who do not fit choose or are forced to leave, and the people remaining are a more homogeneous group than those who were originally hired, which should then result in higher levels of fit for individuals in an organization.

Lastly, the research suggests that for a better fit between an employee and a job, organization, or group to be more probable, it is important to spend an adequate amount of time with the applicant. This is because spending time with members before they enter the firm has been found to be positively associated with the alignment between individual values and firm values at entry. Furthermore, if there are more extensive HR practices in place in the selection phase of hiring, then people are more likely to report that they experience better fits with their job and the organization as a whole.

== Consequences ==
There are few studies that have taken upon the task of trying to synthesize the different types of fit in order to draw significant conclusions about the true impact of fit on individual-level outcomes. However, some progress has been made, but most of the existing reviews have been non-quantitative, undifferentiated between various types of fit, or focused solely on single types of person–environment fit.

Person–environment fit has been linked to a number of affective outcomes, including job satisfaction, organizational commitment, and intent to quit. Among which, job satisfaction is the attitude most strongly predicted by person–job fit. Stress has also been demonstrated as a consequence of poor person–environment fit, especially in the absence of the complementary fit dimension. Since main effects of E are often greater than those of P, making insufficient supplies (P > E) is more detrimental for attitudes than excess supplies (P < E).

== Assessing fit ==
=== Direct measures ===
Compatibility between the person and the environment can be assessed directly or indirectly, depending on the measure. Direct measures of perceived fit are typically used when person-environment fit is conceptualized as general compatibility. These measures ask an individual to report the fit that he or she believes exists. Examples of questions in direct measures are "How well do you think you fit in the organization?" or "How well do your skills match the requirements of your job?" An assumption is made such that individuals assess P and E characteristics and then determine how compatible they are. These judgments have been criticized because they confound the independent effects of the person and the environment with their joint effect and do not adequately capture the psychological process by which people compare themselves to the environment.

=== Indirect measures ===
Indirect measures assess the person and environment separately. These measures are then used to compute an index intended to represent the fit between the person and environment, such as an algebraic, absolute, or squared difference score, or are analyzed jointly to assess the effects of fit without computing a difference score. Characteristics of the person are generally measured through self-report while characteristics of the environment can be reported by the person or by others in the person's environment. French et al. (1974, 1982) differentiated subjective fit, which are the match between P and E as they perceived by employees, from the objective fit, which is the match between P and E as distinct from the person's perception (French et al. 1974; French et al. 1982).

==== Difference Scores and Profile Correlation ====
Up until the 1990s, studies using indirect measures of the person and environment typically operationalized fit by combining the measures into a single index representing the difference between the person and environment. Despite their intuitive appeal, difference scores are plagued with numerous conceptual and methodological problems, such as reduced reliability, conceptual ambiguity, confounded effects, untested constraints, and reducing an inherently three-dimensional relationship between the person, the environment, and the outcome to two dimensions. These problems undermine the interpretation of the results of person-environment fit studies that rely on difference scores. Similar problems apply to studies that operationalize fit using profile similarity indices that compare the person and environment on multiple dimensions.

==== Polynomial regression ====
Many of the problems with difference scores and profile similarity indices can be avoided by using polynomial regression. Polynomial regression involves using measures of the person and environment along with relevant higher-order terms (e.g., the squares and product of the person and environment measures) as joint predictors. In addition to avoiding problems with difference scores, polynomial regression allows for the development and testing of hypotheses that go beyond the simple functions captured by difference scores. The polynomial regression equation commonly used in person-environment fit research is as follows:

$$Z = \beta_0  + \beta_1E + \beta_2P + \beta_3E^2 + \beta_4EP + \beta_5P^2 + \epsilon$$

In this equation, E represents the environment, P represents the person, and Z is the outcome (e.g., satisfaction, well-being, performance). By retaining E, P, and Z as separate variables, results from polynomial regression equations can be translated into three-dimensional surfaces, whose properties can be formally tested using procedures set forth by Edwards and Parry. Studies using polynomial regression have found that the restrictive assumptions underlying difference scores are usually rejected, such that the relationship of the person and environment to outcomes is more complex than the simplified functions represented by difference scores. These findings have provided a foundation for developing fit hypotheses that are more refined than those considered in prior research, such as considering whether the effects of misfit are asymmetric and whether outcomes depend on the absolute levels of the person and environment (e.g., the effects of fit between actual and desired job complexity are likely to vary depending on whether job complexity is low or high).

== Contributing theories ==
=== Supplementary fit ===
Supplementary fit refers to the similarity between characteristics of a person and characteristics of the environment, or other persons within the environment. Based on compatibility that derives from similarity, a person fits into some environmental context because he/she supplements, embellishes, or possesses characteristics that are similar to other individuals in the environment. People perceive themselves as fitting in because they are like or similar to other people possessing the same characteristics. Therefore, it is essentially a model of a person-person fit.

=== Complementary fit ===
Complementary fit occurs when a person's characteristics "make whole" the environment or add to it what is missing. When individuals and environments complement one another by addressing each other's needs, such as when an environment provides opportunities for achievement that are concordant with the individuals' needs for achievement or when an individual with exceptional problem solving skills is in an environment that is in turmoil. Piasentin and Chapman (2007) found that only a small portion of the workforce perceive fit due to complementary while most view fit as supplementary (resulting from being similar to others).

The second dimension of complementary fit is needs supplies fit and demands-abilities fit. Needs-supplies fit occurs when an environment satisfies individuals' needs, desires, or preference. Demands-abilities fit occurs when an individual has the abilities required to meet environmental demands.

The third dimension of perceived versus actual distinction. Perceived fit is typically measured by explicitly asking people to what degree they believe a fit exist. Good fit said to exist as long as it is perceived to exist, regardless of whether or not the person has similar characteristics to, complements, or is complemented by the environment. Actual fit is measured by comparing characteristics at two levels, namely the individual and environment.

== Implications for practice ==
Person–environment fit has important implications for organizations because it is critical for them to establish and maintain a "good fit" between people and their jobs. Companies use a substantial amount of resources when recruiting new employees, and it is crucial for them to ensure that these new hires will align with the environment they are thrust into. Furthermore, it has been theorized that person–environment fit can mediate the relation of group-specific workplace experiences with job outcomes.

== See also ==
- Evolutionary mismatch
- Industrial and organizational psychology
- Job satisfaction
- Occupational health psychology
- Organizational commitment
- Organizational culture
- Organizational climate
- Organizational psychology
- Organizational socialization
- Personality–job fit theory
- Recruitment
