= TPI theory =

Theory in human resource management

The theory of TPI is an attempt to reconcile theoretical understanding of organizational socialization such as the process of integration.

TPI-theory refers that new employees need to develop theoretical (T) and practical (P) skills towards the performance of the new job, but also satisfy needs of (I) interaction that exist among the new employees. These three conditions must be fulfilled to become integrated to the organization. This theory is important to approach an understanding of integration and socialization effects.

== See also ==
- Regulation and organization
- Safety Induction training (in German)
