= Under a White Sky =

2021 non-fiction book by Elizabeth Kolbert

- Author: Elizabeth Kolbert
- Original title: First edition
- Publisher: Crown Publishing Group
- Publication date: 2021

Under a White Sky: The Nature of the Future is a 2021 environmental book by Elizabeth Kolbert. The book follows many of the themes she explored in The Sixth Extinction.

== Summary ==
Under a White Sky is focused on the various kinds of environmental crises created by the Anthropocene and different degrees of technological solutions available to humanity to address them – while also being critical of full-blown techno-solutionism.

The title refers to the most extreme climate change mitigation strategy, solar geoengineering, designed to reflect sunlight from the earth. Throughout the book she explores how a technological fix for one problem can lead to further problems while also acknowledging the important role those technologies might play.

== Reception ==
Reception of the book was generally positive. The Washington Post praised it for "expertly mix[ing] travelogue, science reporting, and explanatory journalism, all with the authority of a writer confident enough to acknowledge ambiguity." The New York Times review focused on how the book explores the ambiguities of our current environmental crisis. A NPR review described the book as "tell[ing] by showing. Without beating the reader over the head, she makes it clear how far we already are from a world of undisturbed, perfectly balanced nature – and how far we must still go to find a new balance for the planet's future that still has us humans in it." The Rolling Stone's Jeff Goodell lauded Kolbert by saying, "To be a well-informed citizen of Planet Earth, you need to read Elizabeth Kolbert..."

Under a White Sky was shortlisted for the 2021 Wainwright Prize in the Global Conservation Writing category. The book made the long list for the 2022 Andrew Carnegie Medal for Excellence in Nonfiction. It was selected for The Washington Post's "10 Best Books of 2021" list.
