= Person–situation debate =

Controversy in personality psychology

The person–situation debate in personality psychology refers to the controversy concerning whether the person or the situation is more influential in determining a person's behavior. Personality trait psychologists believe that a person's personality is relatively consistent across situations. Situationists, opponents of the trait approach, argue that people are not consistent enough from situation to situation to be characterized by broad personality traits. The debate is also an important discussion when studying social psychology, as both topics address the various ways a person could react to a given situation.

== Background ==
Interest in determining whether there were any generalities in behavior began in the 1920s and 30s. Gordon Allport and Henry Murray both supported the idea of a consistent personality with occasional situational influences. Allport noted that "traits become predictable to the extent that identities in stimulus situations are predictable." Others like Edward Thorndike viewed behavior as a composition of responses an individual has to situations.

In 1968, Walter Mischel published a book called Personality and Assessment claiming that behavior is too cross-situationally inconsistent to be classified with personality traits. He stated:

"...with the possible exception of intelligence, highly generalised behavioral consistencies have not been demonstrated, and the concept of personality traits as broad dispositions is thus untenable"

His book was a non-systematic meta-analysis of some of the research on the relationship between behavioral and personality traits (assessed by either self-report or peer-report). The book also assessed studies regarding measurements of behavior from one situation to another. This book generated a formidable dispute between social psychologists and trait theorists because trait questionnaires had been used to measure personality for many decades. Behaviorism had dominated the field of psychology up until this time, making Mischel's claim devastating to the mainstream consensus amongst personality psychologists and causing many psychologists to question and doubt whether personality exists.

According to David C. Funder, Mischel's book posed three main questions:

- Is personality consistent and does it overcome situational influences?
- Are people's intuitions about each other's personalities generally flawed or generally correct?
- If personality is really that consistent, why are psychologists continuing to argue about this issue?

More recently, Mischel has retracted some of his original claims, protesting that some psychologists misinterpreted his argument to mean he believes personality does not exist.

One of the largest critiques of the person-situation debate is that it does not follow "modern science", as it studies specific people in specific situations and is difficult to replicate and generalize results.

== Situationist argument ==
Situationists had a number of arguments, but they can be generally summarized into four:

1. Low correlations between measures of behavior and personality: In psychological research, whether relationships between variables exist are compared by the correlation coefficient. Mischel argued that in his literature review of personality research, the correlation between personality and behavior, or behavior across situations, rarely exceeded .30-.40. Because the correlations are close to zero, Mischel concluded that personality traits have little to no relationship to shaping behavior. This claim was especially detrimental to personality psychology and continues to haunt many fields of psychology research today.
2. The validity of self-report measures and clinical assessment procedures: Most of the studies that Mischel reviewed had taken place in laboratory settings. Rarely was behavior analyzed in natural settings. The claim was that trait psychologists did not adequately combat issues of method variance, social desirability and response sets, and construct validity when they constructed their measures of traits. The practical utility of trait measurements in predicting behavior was also questioned. Even when observation studies were conducted, there was observer bias (that is, traits are in the eye of the beholder).
3. The type of behavioral assessment and treatment procedures that were becoming popular at the time: These treatments and behavioral assessment methods focused on the situational influences on behavior, rather than personality traits.
4. Stability: behavior is not cross-situationally consistent, and any stability can be attributed to the consistency of the situation, not the person. Situationists questioned whether personality traits exist when behaviors are not consistent across situations; after all, why spend time studying a construct that has no validity?

Because of the aforementioned points, situationists argued that the predictive ability of personality traits is severely lacking. Opponents of the trait approach claimed that the idea of personality traits is fundamentally flawed and that behavior would be better understood through conditioning and learning processes.

== Responses ==
Over time, personality psychologists have formed rebuttals to Mischel's criticisms. According to Funder, Mischel's analysis was quite short (only 16 pages), and therefore was not comprehensive of the personality literature available at the time. With a fair review of the literature, the predictability of behavior from traits may be larger than what researchers previously assumed.

Improved research methods can increase the predictability. The situationist argument was formed based on research studies that were conducted in laboratory situations, and therefore did not reflect behavior in real life. When studying behaviors in a more natural setting, personality is likely to influence behavior. According to Allport, personality will be more likely to exhibit greater apparent effects in real situations that are important and influential to the individual being observed.

Predictability can also be influenced depending on what is being measured, and some behaviors may be more consistent than others. For example, the amount a person gestures or the volume of a person's voice are more likely to be consistent across situations than goal-directed behaviors, such as when a person is trying to impress another person.

It may also be that on average, individuals act consistently, and therefore personality research may be more telling as general behavioral trends than specific instances. This is evident in when people are interested in personalities of others, they are more interested in how others will generally act, not one specific behavior at a specific time.

A correlation of .40 is not that small of a correlation and can explain more variance than most people think. Correlation coefficients of the effects found in studies of personality variables cannot be comparable with effects found in studies of situational variables because the two styles of research do not employ a common metric. After converting the statistics that social psychologists use in analyzing situation variables and behavior into correlations used by personality psychologists in analyzing trait variables and behavior, Funder and Daniel J. Ozer found that the correlations between situations and behaviors are also around the .30–.40 range. After conversion, it was found that even well-respected studies, like the one conducted by Stanley Milgram on obedience that used fake electric shocks to study how people react to being asked to cause harm to others (Milgram Experiment), found correlations of situations and behaviors to be around .40. Moreover, survey studies that compare the effects of situational variables on behavior show that the correlation between situation and behavior are also around the .30–.40 range. Seymour Epstein found that if the behaviors were aggregated over time, the cross situational consistency of behaviors is much higher. Even in highly controlled studies, cross-situational consistency is around the .40 range.

Personality traits are important because personality traits exist. The field of personality psychology gained attention when Allport had his assistant, Henry Odbert, counted how many different words in the English dictionary could be used to describe differences in personality. Odbert reported 17, 953. With such a large number of words that are related to personality trait differences, Allport and Odbert proposed the Lexical hypothesis, or the theory that traits are obviously an important part of how people think and talk about each other, or else it would not be a part of the language. Words that make people more sensitive to individual differences are continuing to be created and formed today.

== Current directions ==
Mischel's book raised important questions about trait concepts and measures in psychological research. Researchers like Douglas Kenrick and Funder note that controversy is beneficial to scientific research because it helps narrow down competing hypotheses.

Most personality researchers have now concluded that both the person and the situation contribute to behavior. Specifically, situational variables are more conclusive when it comes to predicting behavior in specific situations, while traits are more descriptive of patterns of behavior that influence behavior across situations. Some researchers have suggested the possibility of situational factors (like social roles) eliciting situation-specific goals which then influence the development of personality traits. On the other hand, recent research has found that person-specific traits (like achievement emotions), which are developed by personality traits, may contribute to how someone perceives and then acts in a situation.

Some believe that the person-situation debate came to a resolution in the 1970s, though it is still widely discussed as if the debate as not ended. One possible reason the debate is still discussed is because it criticizes foundational personality psychology ideas from Franz Boas and John B. Watson that date back to the early 20th century.

=== Interactionism ===
The interactionism perspective recognizes that the effect of personality depends on the situation and that situations are affected by the personalities of the people who are present. Interactionism also recognizes that people often choose situations that reflect their personalities. One of the many interactionism researchers, A. R. Buss, introduced the idea that persons and situations interact in three different ways:

- The effect of personality on behavior depends on the situation and vice versa
- Certain people typically find themselves in certain situations, depending on their personality
- People change situations by how they act and what they do in these situations.

A commonly used example of person-situation interaction is the Stanford prison experiment, where college students participated in a study that simulated a prison setting with some students acting as guards and others as prisoners. The study was terminated when the guards became even more abusive than anticipated. While Philip Zimbardo concluded that the study shows evidence of the effect of the situation transcending personality traits, more recent studies show that these students were drawn to participate in a study of "prison life" because of their personality characteristics.

=== Synthesis ===
Personality psychologists William Fleeson and Erik Noftle have suggested that the person-situation debate ended in a synthesis. According to them, there is more than one type of behavior consistency. Traits are not robustly predictive of cross-situational consistency, but rather, predictive of consistency for a wide distribution of behaviors over time. Personality is not by itself a strong predictor of behavior but a better predictor can be ascertained from an average of behavior in environments. This will lead to a better model called density distributions. These models track how strongly a participant reacts in given situations. Fleeson posited that an individual has an anchor mean level of a trait, but the individual's behavior can vary around this mean depending on situations. Therefore, this distribution could account for the low cross-situational consistency of single acts of behavior while also explaining the high consistency of behaviors over time.

== See also ==
- Attitudinal fix
- Structural fix
- Trait activation theory
- Code-switching
