= Situationism (disambiguation) =

Situationism may also refer to:

- A term applied to the ideas of the Situationist International, an international political and artistic movement active from 1957 through 1972
- Situationism (psychology), a current started in 1968 which holds that personality is more influenced by external factors than by internal traits or motivations
- Situational ethics, a Christian ethical theory developed in 1963 by Episcopal priest Joseph Fletcher, according to which the morality of an act is a function of the state of the system when it occurs
