= Situationalism =

Situationalism may refer to:

- Situational ethics
- Situationist International
- Situationism (psychology)
