= Structural fix =

A structural fix refers to solving a problem or resolving a conflict by bringing about structural changes that change the underlying structures that provoked or sustain these problems. According to Thomas Heberlein such changes modify human behavior by regulating the social settings or the 'structures' in which the behavior occurs − their context. Such fixes are typically long-term opposed to temporary and require open and in-depth inquiry for the root structural causes of a problem and understanding of a system. Effectively changing norms would be an example of a structural fix. Often structural fixes involve a change of incentives.

== See also ==
- Attitudinal fix
- Behavior modification
- Behavioural change theories
- Design for behaviour change
- Person–situation debate
- Problem finding
- Root cause analysis
- Social change
- Systems thinking
- Technological fix
- Workaround
