= Field Notes from a Catastrophe =

2006 book by Elizabeth Kolbert

Field Notes from a Catastrophe: Man, Nature and Climate Change
- 1st edition cover.
- Author: Elizabeth Kolbert
- Language: English
- Genre: Non-fiction
- Publisher: Bloomsbury USA
- Publication date: 2006
- Publication place: United States
- Media type: Print (Hardcover and Paperback)
- Pages: 225 pp (2007 paperback edition)
- ISBN: 1-59691-125-5
- OCLC: 62134789
- Dewey Decimal: 363.738/74 22
- LC Class: QC981.8.G56 K655 2006

Field Notes from a Catastrophe: Man, Nature, and Climate Change is a non-fiction environmental science book by Elizabeth Kolbert that was published by Bloomsbury Publishing in 2006. The book documents a series of scientific observations and political processes, bringing attention to the causes and effects of global climate change. In this book, Kolbert is able to make scientific developments accessible to a very wide audience.

== Synopsis ==
Kolbert travels around the world where climate change is affecting the environment in significant ways. These locations include Alaska, Greenland, the Netherlands, and Iceland. The environmental effects that are apparent consist of rising sea levels, thawing permafrost, diminishing ice shelves, changes in migratory patterns, and increasingly devastating forest fires due to loss of precipitation. She also speaks with many leading scientists about their individual research and findings. Kolbert brings to attention the attempts of large corporations such as ExxonMobil and General Motors to influence politicians and discredit scientists. She also writes about America’s reluctance in the global efforts to reduce carbon emissions. Leading this resistance, she explained, was the Bush administration, which was opposed to the Kyoto Protocol since it was ratified in 2005. Kolbert concludes the book by examining the events surrounding the events of Hurricane Katrina in 2005 and arguing that governments have the knowledge and technologies to prepare for such disasters but choose to ignore the signs until it is too late.

== See also ==
- The Sixth Extinction: An Unnatural History
- Business action on climate change
- Climate change in the Arctic
- Effects of global warming
- ExxonMobil climate change controversy
- Politicization of science
