= Technological fix =

Attempt at using engineering or technology to solve a problem

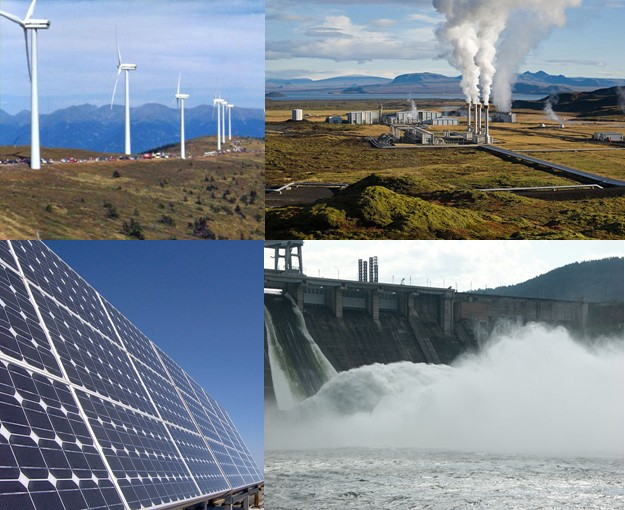
Renewable energy is one primary example of a technological fix, as it has been designed to combat the issues associated with climate change.

A technological fix, technical fix, technological shortcut or (techno-)solutionism is an attempt to use engineering or technology to solve a problem (often created by earlier technological interventions). The term “technological fix” was coined in the mid-1960s and popularized by the American physicist Alvin Weinberg, who defined it as "a means for resolving a societal problem by adroit use of technology and with little or no alteration of social behavior.”

Some references consider that technological fixes are inevitable in modern technology, since it has been observed that many technologies, although invented and developed to solve certain perceived problems, often create other problems in the process, known as externalities. In this regard, technological fixes are viewed as an "attempt to repair the harm of a technology by modification of the system", that might involve modification of the machine and/or modification of the procedures for operating and maintaining it. In other words, there would be modification of the basic hardware, modification of techniques and procedures, or both.

The technological fix is the idea that all problems can find solutions in better and new technologies. It now is used as a dismissive phrase to describe cheap, quick fixes by using inappropriate technologies; these fixes often create more problems than they solve or give people a sense that they have solved the problem.

== Contemporary context ==
In the contemporary context, technological fix is sometimes used to refer to the idea of using data and intelligent algorithms to supplement and improve human decision making in the hope that this would result in ameliorating the bigger problem. One critic, Evgeny Morozov defines this as "Recasting all complex social situations either as neat problems with definite, computable solutions or as transparent and self-evident processes that can be easily optimized –— only the right algorithms are in place." Morozov has defined this perspective as an ideology that is especially prevalent in Silicon Valley, and named it "solutionism". While some criticize this approach to the issues of today as detrimental to efforts to truly solve these problems, opponents find merits in such approach to technological improvement of our society as complements to existing activists and policy efforts.

An example of the criticism is how policy makers may be tempted to think that installing smart energy monitors would help people conserve energy better, thus improving global warming, rather than focusing on the arduous process of passing laws to tax carbon, etc. Another example is the use of technological tools alone to solve complex sociopolitical crises such as pandemics, or the belief that such crises can be solved through the integration of technical fixes alone.

=== Algorithms ===
The definition of algorithms according to the Oxford Languages dictionary is “a process or set of rules to be followed in calculations or other problem-solving operations, especially by a computer.” Algorithms are increasingly used as technological fixes in modern society to replace tasks or decision-making by humans, often to reduce labor costs, increase efficiency, or reduce human bias. These solutions serve as a “quick and flawless way to solve complex real world problems… but technology isn’t magic”. The use of algorithms as fixes, however, are not addressing the root causes of these problems. Instead, algorithms are more often being used as “band-aid” solutions that may provide temporary relief, but do not ameliorate the issue for good. Additionally, these fixes tend to come with their own problems, some of which are even more harmful than the original problem.

One example of algorithms as a technological fix for increasing public safety is face recognition software, which has been used by the San Diego County police department and the Pittsburgh police department, among other government security organizations. Face recognition is an example of algorithmic technology that is viewed as potentially having many benefits for its users, such as verifying one’s identity in security systems. This system uses biometrics to quantify and map out distinguishing facial features. However, face recognition as a technological fix for safety and security concerns comes with issues of privacy and discrimination. In the case of face recognition technology being used by the San Diego County police department, Black men were being falsely accused of crimes due to being mistakenly identified by the software. Additionally, San Diego police used the face recognition software on African Americans up to twice as often than on other people. The cases of discrimination perpetuated by the face recognition tool led to a three-year ban on its use starting in 2019. Instead of addressing systemic and historically embedded issues of inequalities among racial groups, the face recognition technology was used to perpetuate discrimination and support police in doing their jobs unfairly and inaccurately.

Another example of algorithms being used as a technological fix is tools to automate decision-making, such as in the cases of Oregon’s Child Welfare Risk Tool and the Pittsburgh Allegheny County Family Screening Tool (AFST). In these cases, algorithms replacing humans as decision makers have been used to fix the underlying issues of the cost of employees to make child welfare case decisions and to eliminate human biases in the decision-making process. However, researchers at Carnegie Mellon University found that the tool discriminates against Black families, who are statistically underserved and have historically lived in lower-income areas. This historical data caused by systemic disparities causes the algorithm to flag a greater percentage of children of Black families as high risk than children of White families. By using data based on historical biases, the automated decisions further fuel racial disparities, and actually accomplish the opposite of the intended outcomes.

== Climate change ==
The technological fix for climate change is an example of the use of technology to restore the environment. This can be seen through various different strategies such as: renewable energy and climate engineering.

=== Renewable energy ===
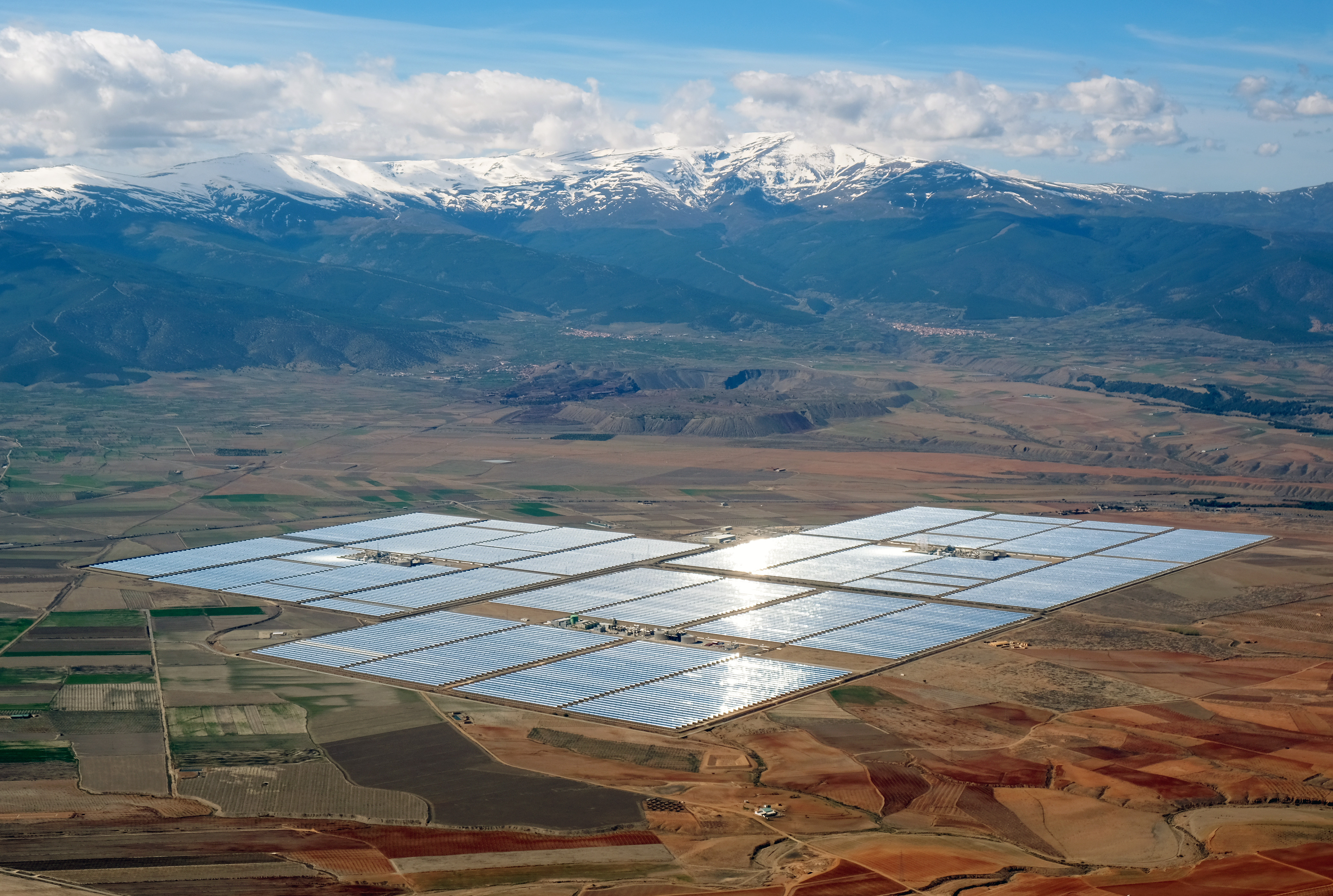
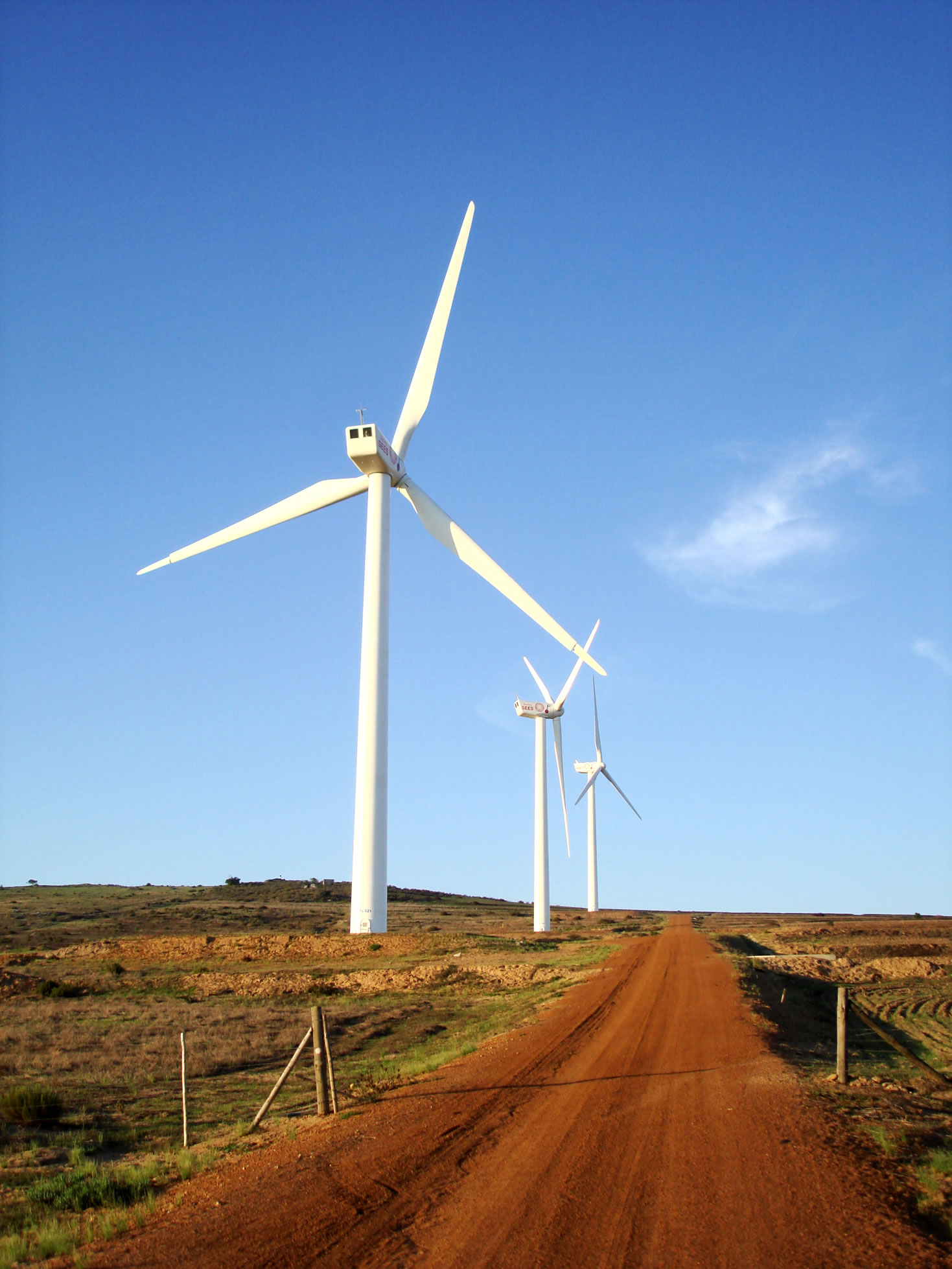
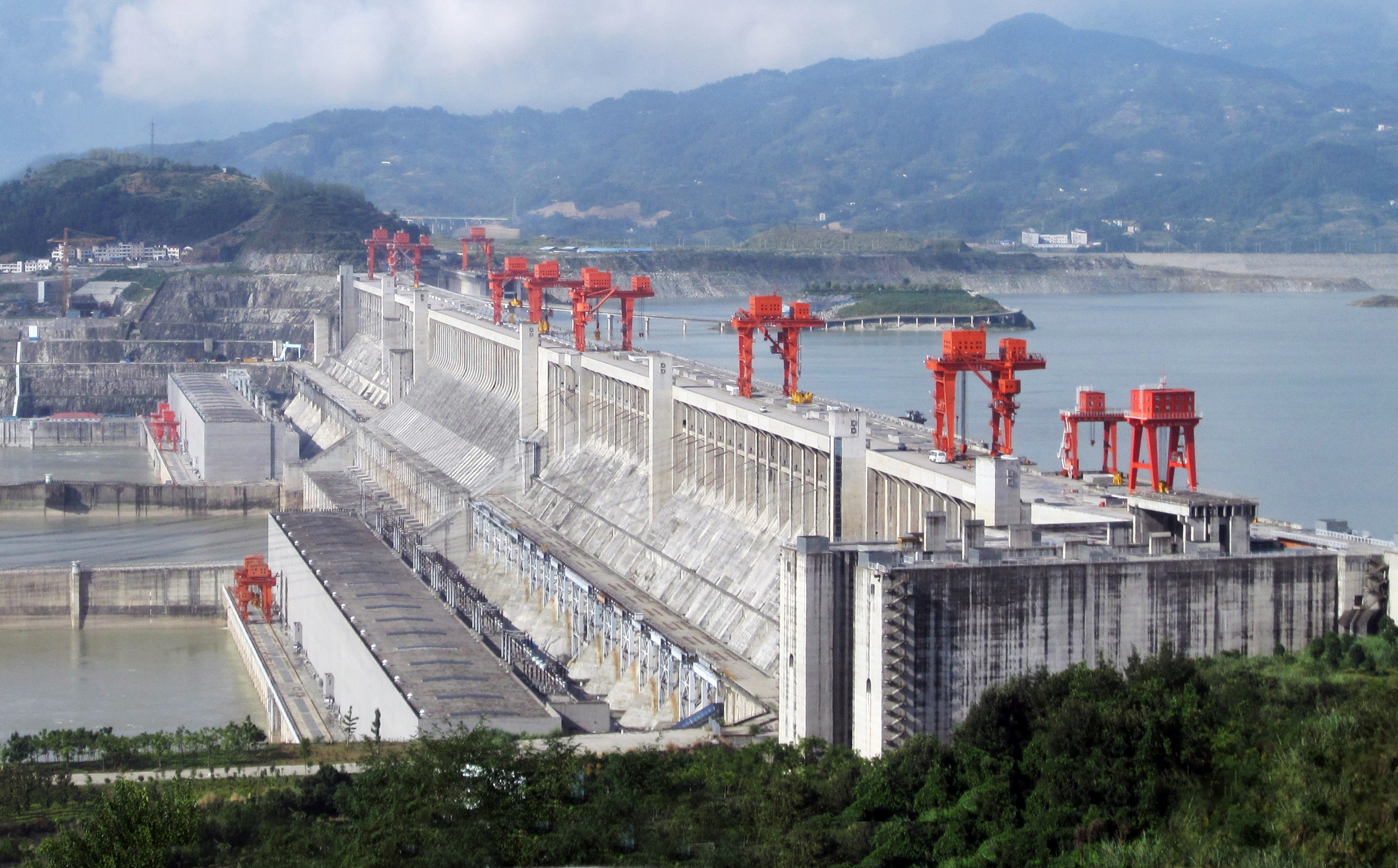
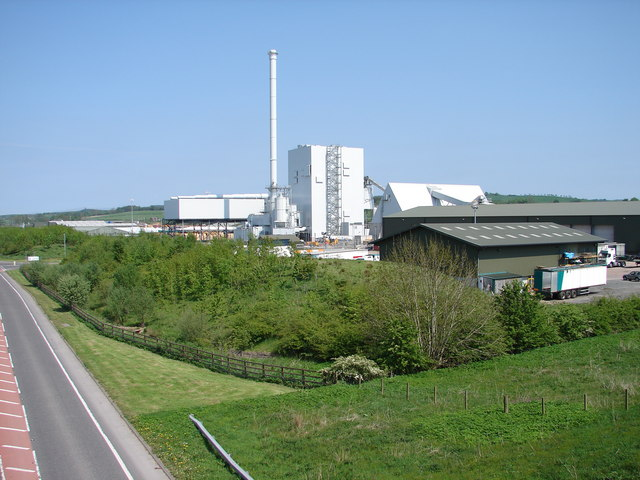
Examples of renewable energy: concentrated solar power in Spain; wind energy in South Africa; the Three Gorges Dam on the Yangtze River in China; biomass energy plant in Scotland.

Renewable energy (also called green energy) is energy made from renewable natural resources that are replenished on a human timescale. The most widely used renewable energy types are solar energy, wind power, bioenergy/biomass, and hydropower. Bioenergy and geothermal power are also significant in some countries. Renewable energy installations can be large or small and are suited for both urban and rural areas. Renewable energy is often deployed together with further electrification. This has several benefits: electricity can move heat and vehicles efficiently and is clean at the point of consumption. Variable renewable energy sources are those that have a fluctuating nature, such as wind power and solar power. In contrast, controllable renewable energy sources include dammed hydroelectricity, bioenergy, or geothermal power.

For an energy to be renewable, it must be an endless source. Nuclear power is therefore not considered renewable, due to its reliance on non-renewable fuel.

=== Climate engineering ===
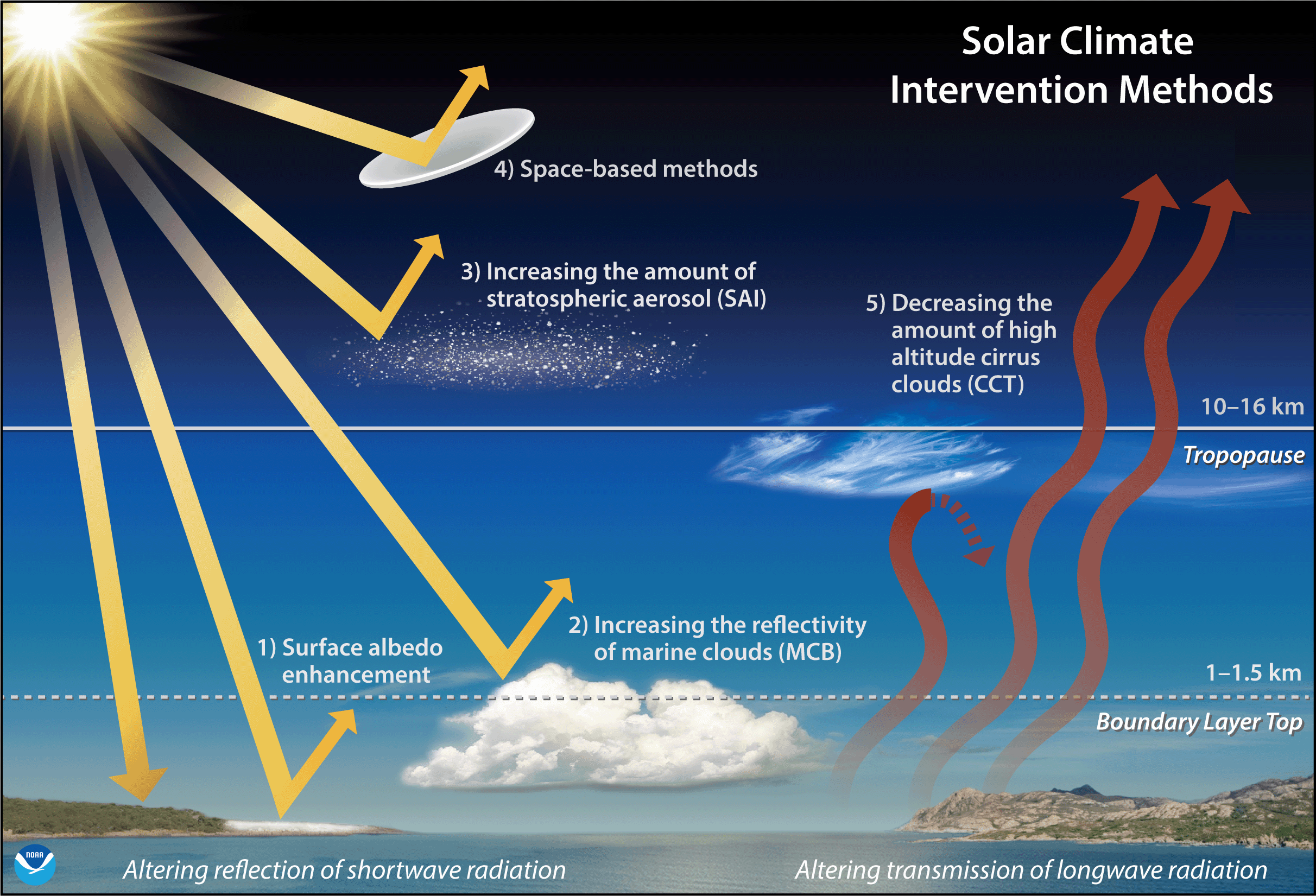
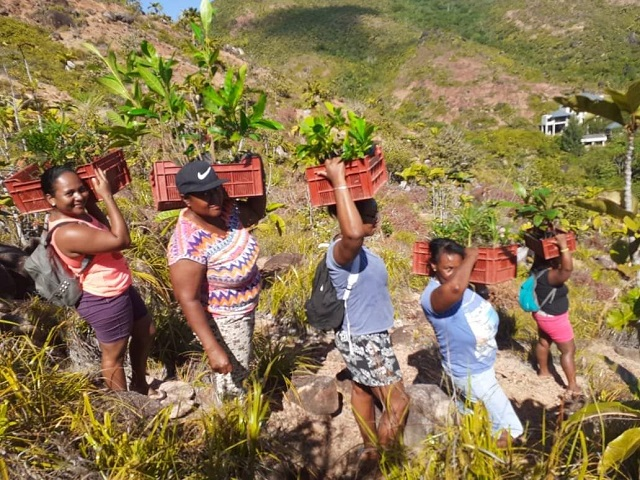
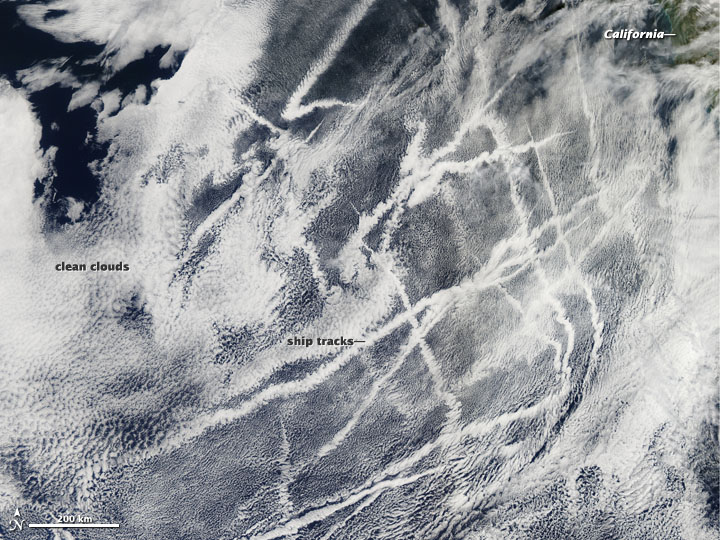
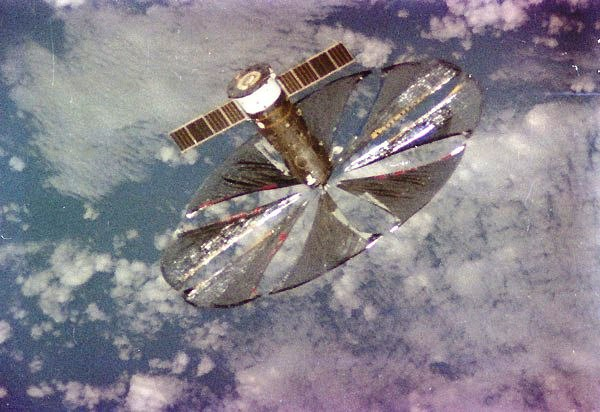
Examples of geoengineering methods: Solar radiation modification technologies, reforestation in the Seychelles, (marine cloud brightening), experimental space mirror.

Geoengineering (also known as climate engineering or climate intervention) is the deliberate large-scale interventions in the Earth’s climate system intended to counteract human-caused climate change. The term commonly encompasses two broad categories: large-scale carbon dioxide removal (CDR) and solar radiation modification (SRM). CDR involves techniques to remove carbon dioxide from the atmosphere and is generally considered a form of climate change mitigation. SRM aims to reduce global warming by reflecting a small portion of sunlight (solar radiation) away from Earth and back into space. Although historically grouped together, these approaches differ substantially in mechanisms, timelines, and risk profiles, and are now typically discussed separately. Some other large-scale engineering proposals—such as interventions to slow the melting of polar and alpine ice—are also sometimes classified as forms of geoengineering.

Some types of geoengineering present political, social and ethical issues. One common objection is that focusing on these technologies could undermine efforts to reduce greenhouse gas emissions. Effective governance and international oversight are widely regarded as essential.

== Externalities ==
Externalities are the unforeseen or unintended consequences of technology. It is evident that everything new and innovative can potentially have negative effects, especially if it is a new area of development. Although technologies are invented and developed to solve certain perceived problems, they often create other problems in the process.

=== Algorithms ===
Evgeny Morozov, writer and researcher on social implications of technology, has said, “A new problem-solving infrastructure is new; new types of solutions become possible that weren’t possible 15 years ago”. The issue with the use of algorithms as technological fixes is that they shouldn’t be applied as a one-size-fits-all solution because each problem comes with its own context and implications. While algorithms can offer solutions, it can also amplify discriminatory harms, especially to already marginalized groups. These externalities include racial bias, gender bias, and disability discrimination.

Oftentimes, algorithms are implemented into systems without a clear understanding of whether or not it is an appropriate solution to a problem. In Understanding perception of algorithmic decisions: Fairness, trust, and emotion in response to algorithmic management, Min Kyung Lee writes, “...the problem is that industries often incorporate technology whose performance and effectiveness are not yet proven, without careful validation and reflection.” Algorithms may offer immediate relief to problems or an optimistic outlook to the current issues at hand, but they can also create more problems that require even more complex solutions. Sometimes, the use of algorithms as a technological fix leaves us asking, “Did anyone ask for this?” and wondering whether the benefits outweigh the harms. These tradeoffs should be rigorously assessed in order to determine if an algorithm is truly the most appropriate solution.

=== DDT ===
DDT was initially used by the United States military in World War II to control a range of different illnesses, varying from malaria to the bubonic plague and body lice. Due to the efficiency of DDT, it was soon adopted as a farm pesticide to help maximise crop yields to consequently cope with the rising population's food demands post WWII. This pesticide proved to be extremely effective in killing bugs and animals on crops, and was often referred as the "wonder-chemical". However, DDT was banned for over forty years after it was found that DDT accumulated within the fatty cells of both humans and animals.

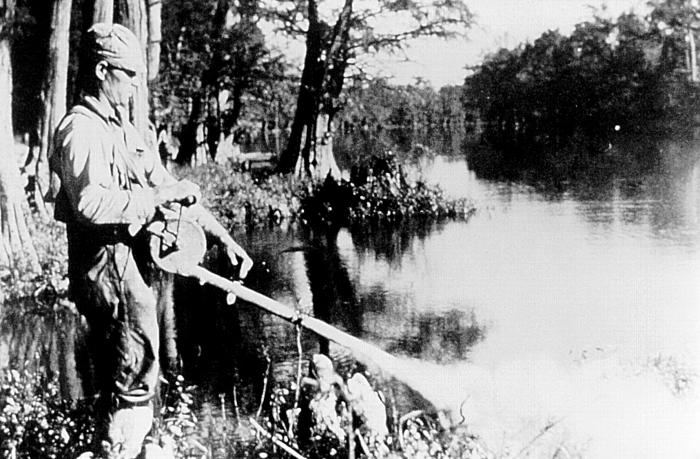
DDT being sprayed (1958, The United States' National Malaria Eradication Program)

In humans, DDT was found to cause:

- Breast and other cancers
- Male infertility
- Miscarriages and low birth weight
- Developmental delay
- Nervous system and liver damage

DDT is toxic to birds when eaten; it decreases the reproductive rate of birds by causing eggshell thinning and embryo deaths. DDT negatively affects various systems in aquatic animals, including the heart and brain. DDT is moderately toxic to amphibians like frogs, toads, and salamanders. Immature amphibians are more sensitive to the effects of DDT than adults.

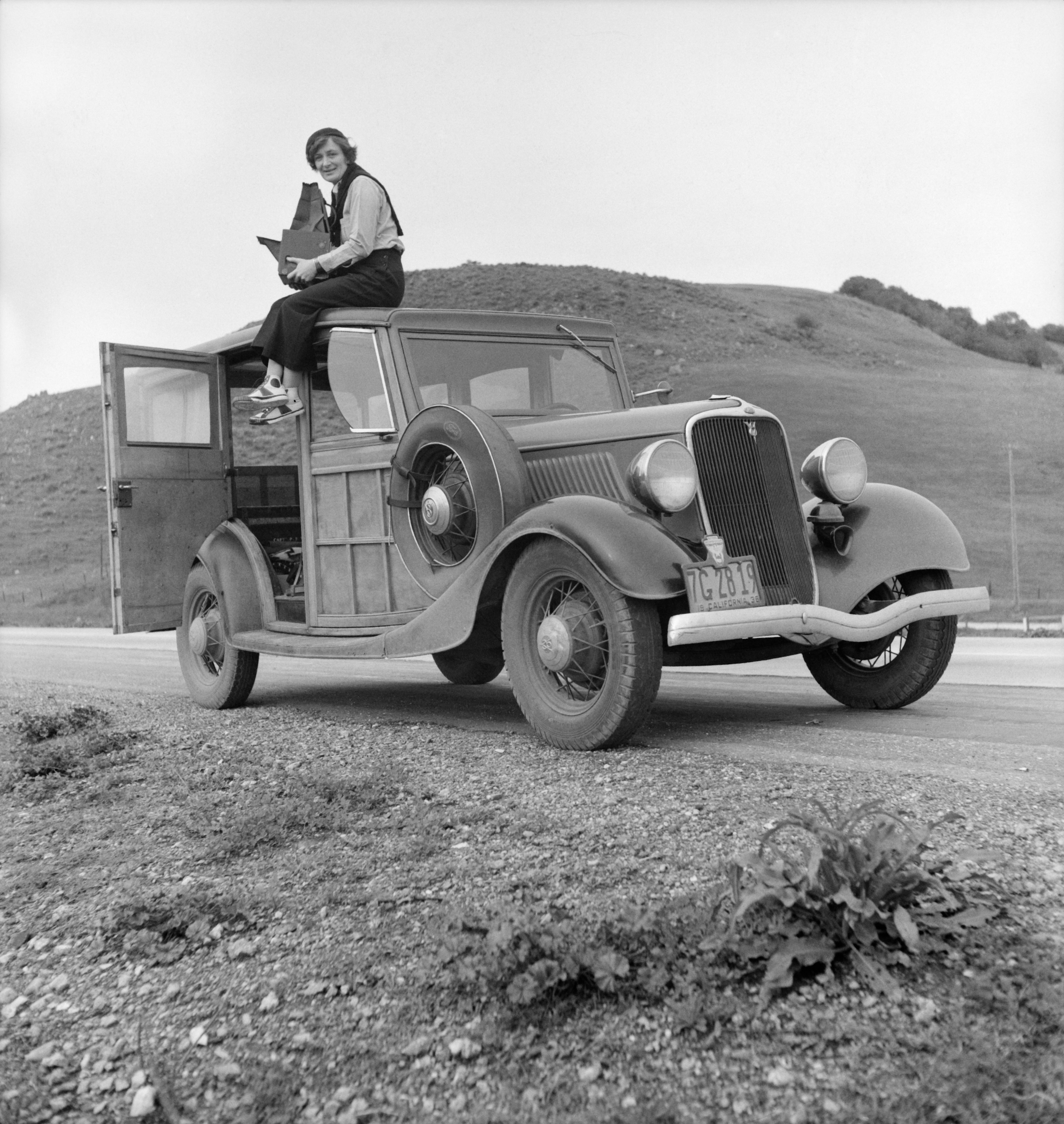
Automobile in 1936

=== Automobiles ===
Automobiles with internal combustion engines have revolutionised civilisation and technology. However, whilst the technology was new and innovative, helping to connect places through the ability of transport, it was not recognised at the time that burning fossil fuels, such as coal and oil, inside the engines would release pollutants. This is an explicit example of an externality caused by a technological fix, as the problems caused from the development of the technology was not recognised at the time.

== Different types of technological fixes ==
=== High-tech megaprojects ===
High-tech megaprojects are large scale and require huge sums of investment and revenue to be created. Examples of these high technologies are dams, nuclear power plants, and airports. They usually cause externalities on other factors such as the environment, are highly expensive, and are top-down governmental plans.

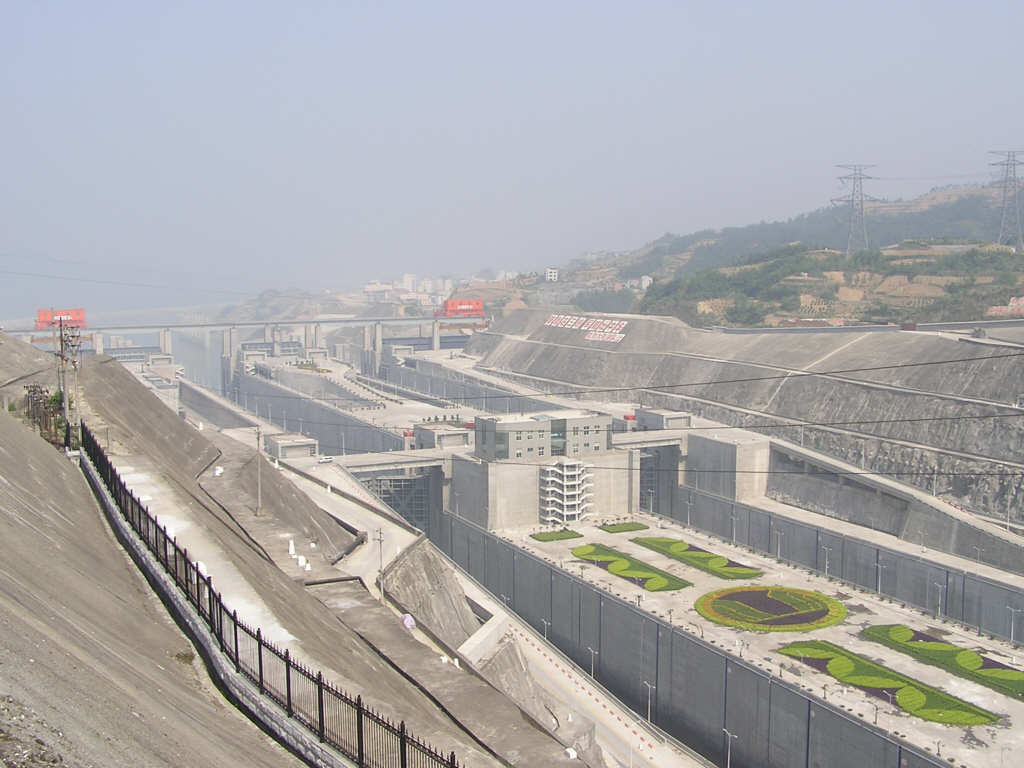
The Three Gorges Dam is a hydroelectric dam.

==== Three Gorges Dam ====
The Three Gorges Dam is an example of a high-tech technological fix. The creation of the multi-purpose navigation hydropower and flood control scheme was designed to fix the issues with flooding whilst providing efficient, clean renewable hydro-electric power in China. The Three Gorges Dam is the world's largest power station in terms of installed capacity (22,500 MW). The dam is the largest operating hydroelectric facility in terms of annual energy generation, generating 83.7 TWh in 2013 and 98.8 TWh in 2014, while the annual energy generation of the Itaipú Dam in Brazil and Paraguay was 98.6 TWh in 2013 and 87.8 in 2014. It was estimated to have cost over £25 billion. There have been many externalities from this technology, such as the extinction of the Chinese River Dolphin, an increase in pollution, as the river can no longer 'flush' itself, and over 4 million locals being displaced in the area.

=== Intermediate technology ===
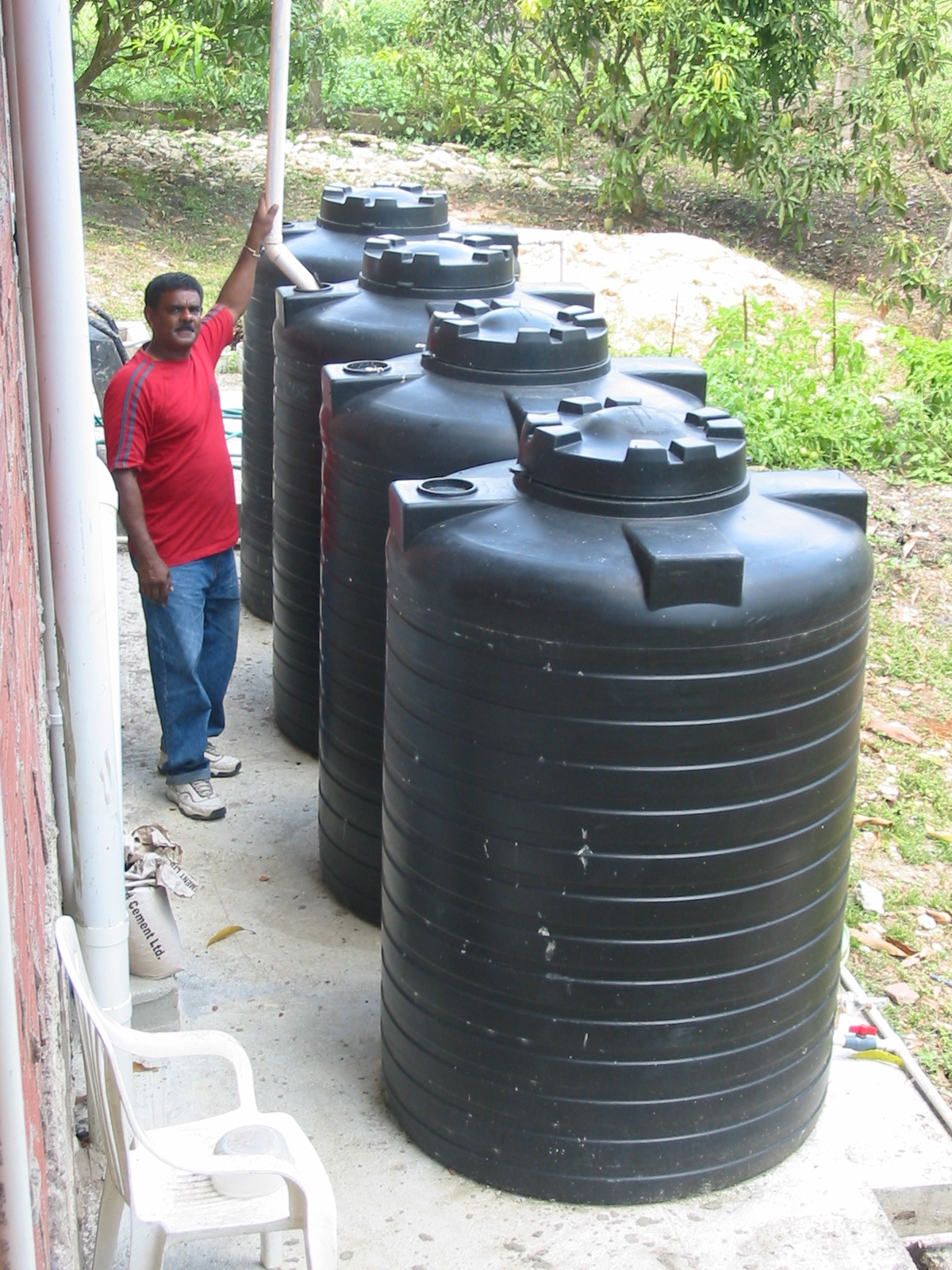
Rainwater harvesting

Intermediate technology is usually small-scale and inexpensive, typically found in developing countries. The capital to build and create these technologies is usually low, yet labour is high. Local expertise can be used to maintain these technologies making them very quick and effective to build and repair. An example of an intermediate technology can be seen by water wells, rain barrels and pumpkin tanks.

=== Appropriate technologies ===
Technology that suits the level of income, skills and needs of the people. Therefore, this factor encompasses both high and low technologies.

An example of this can be seen by developing countries that implement technologies that suit their expertise, such as rain barrels and hand pumps. These technologies are low costing and can be maintained by local skills, making them affordable and efficient. However, to implement rain barrels in a developed country would not be appropriate, as it would not suit the technological advancement apparent in these countries. Therefore, appropriate technological fixes take into consideration the level of development within a country before implementing them.

== Concerns ==
Michael and Joyce Huesemann caution against the hubris of large-scale technological fixes. In the book Techno-Fix: Why Technology Won't Save Us Or the Environment, they show why the negative unintended consequences of science and technology are inherently unavoidable and unpredictable, why counter-technologies or technological fixes are not lasting solutions, and why modern technology in the current context promotes collapse instead of sustainability.

Naomi Klein is a prominent opponent of the view that simply technological fixes will solve problems. She explained her concerns in her book This Changes Everything: Capitalism vs. the Climate and states that technical fixes for climate change, such as geoengineering, bring significant risks, as "we simply don't know enough about the Earth system to be able to re-engineer it safely". According to her, the proposed technique of, for instance, dimming the rays of the sun with sulphate-spraying helium balloons (in order to mimic the cooling effect on the atmosphere of large volcanic eruptions) is highly dangerous, and such schemes will surely be attempted if abrupt climate change gets seriously underway. Such concerns are explored in their complexity in Elizabeth Kolbert's Under a White Sky.

Various experts and environmental groups have also come forward with their concerns over views and approaches that look for technological fixes as solutions, and warn that those would be "misguided, unjust, profoundly arrogant and endlessly dangerous" approaches as well as over the prospect of a technological 'fix' for global warming, however impractical, causing lessened political pressure for a real solution.

== See also ==
- Attitudinal fix
- Structural fix
- Differential technological development
- Law of Unintended Consequences
- Philosophy of technology
- Social engineering (political science)
- Technocentrism
