= Elizabeth Kolbert =

American journalist, author, and scholar (born 1961)

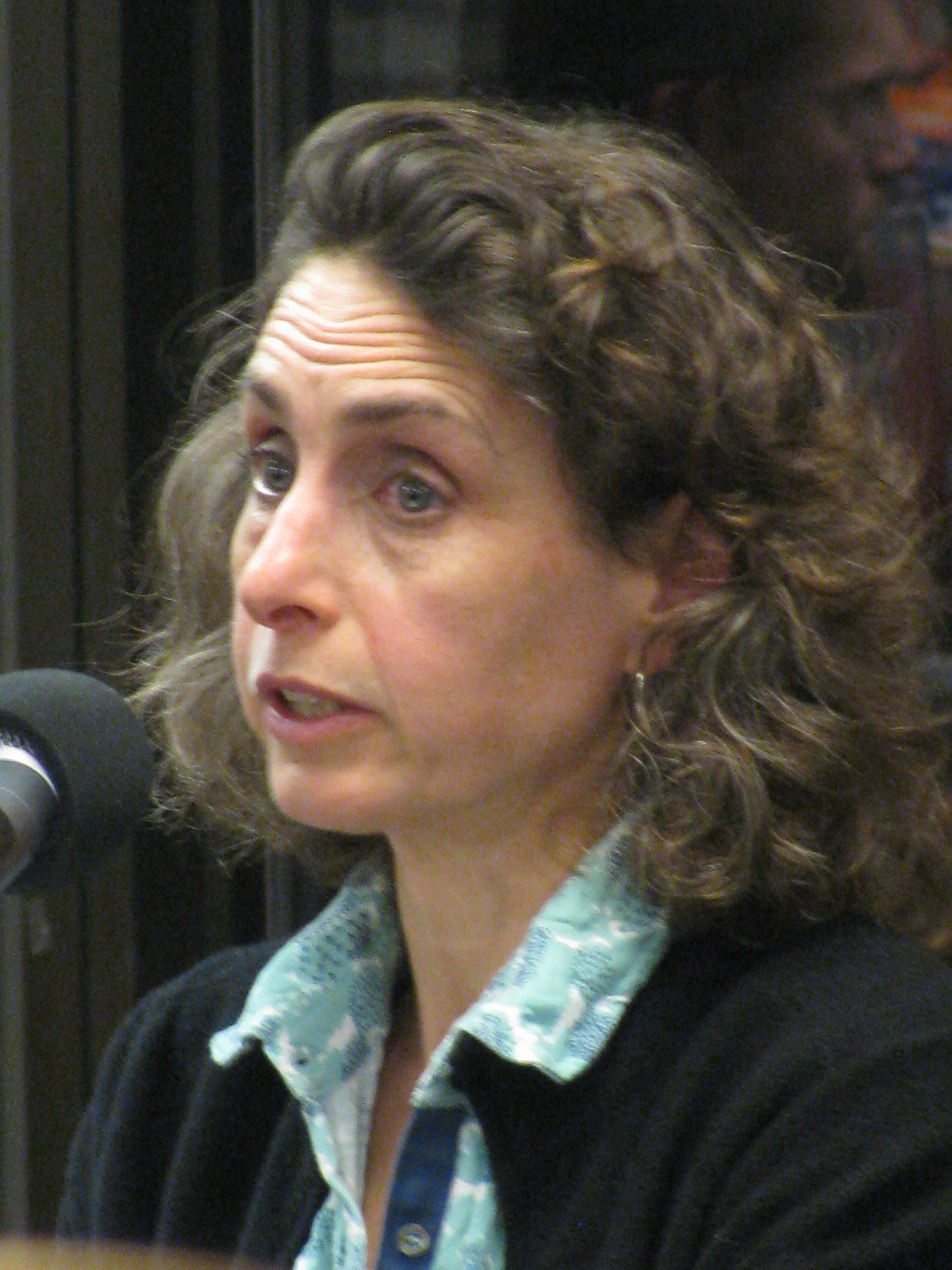
- Kolbert in 2014
- Born: July 6, 1961 (age 65)
- Education: Yale University
- Occupations: Political and Environmental Journalist and Author
- Spouse: John Kleiner (married 1991–present)
- Children: 3
- Awards: National Magazine Award (2006); National Magazine Award (2010); Heinz Award (2010); Pulitzer Prize (2015)

Elizabeth Kolbert (born July 6, 1961) is an American author and journalist. Since 1999, she has been a staff writer for The New Yorker, where she has covered politics and the environment.

She is the author of six books, including The Sixth Extinction: An Unnatural History (a New York Times bestseller and Pulitzer Prize winner) and Under a White Sky, which was one of Washington Post's ten best books of 2021.

Kolbert is a two-time National Magazine Award winner and is a member of the American Academy of Arts and Letters. Her work has appeared in The Best American Science and Nature Writing and The Best American Essays. She served as a member of the Bulletin of the Atomic Scientists' Science and Security Board from 2017 to 2020.

Kolbert has traveled across the globe, visiting scientists and researchers to discuss global warming and climate change. Her work has taken her to Alaska, Hawaii, Greenland, Australia, and Iceland in the discovery of science and the impacts of human life to the planet.

== Early life ==
Kolbert was born on 6 July 1961. She spent much her early childhood in the Bronx before her family relocated to Larchmont. She remained there until 1979.

Kolbert’s grandfather was a refugee from Nazi Germany. Kolbert recounts that through his life, he had been a fan of author Karl May’s writing, specifically on the West. Later, when he had immigrated to the US, Kolbert’s grandfather would take Kolbert’s mother and siblings out West. Kolbert’s mother continued this tradition with her children. “I thought I, too, should go have adventures out West.”

Kolbert’s father, was an optmalogist and her mother, Marlene Kolbert, was a homemaker that stayed active within their community, participating on the school board and local politics.

After graduating from Mamaroneck High School, Kolbert spent four years studying literature at Yale University. In 1983, she was awarded a Fulbright Scholarship to study at Universität Hamburg, in Germany.

== Career ==
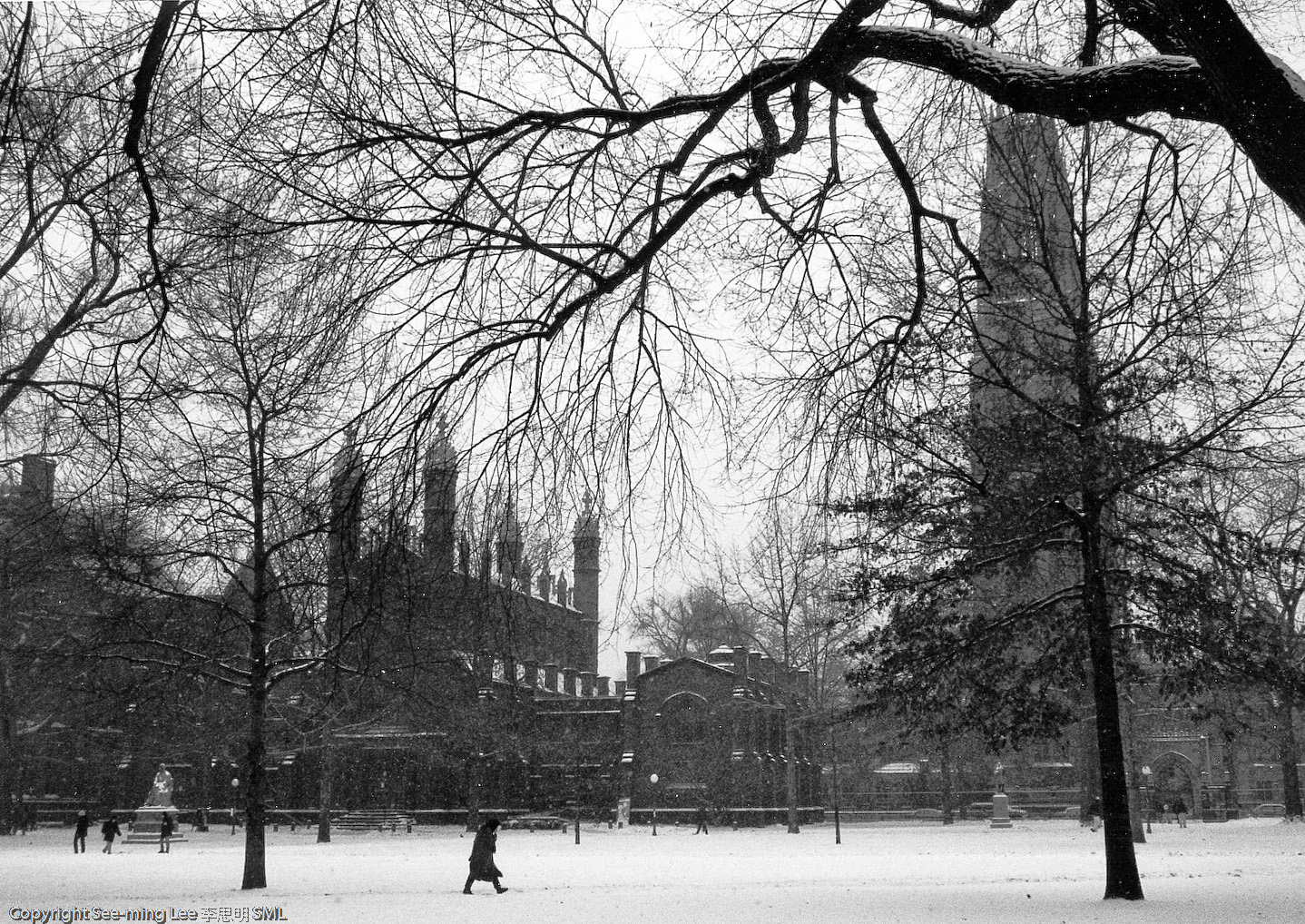
Yale University

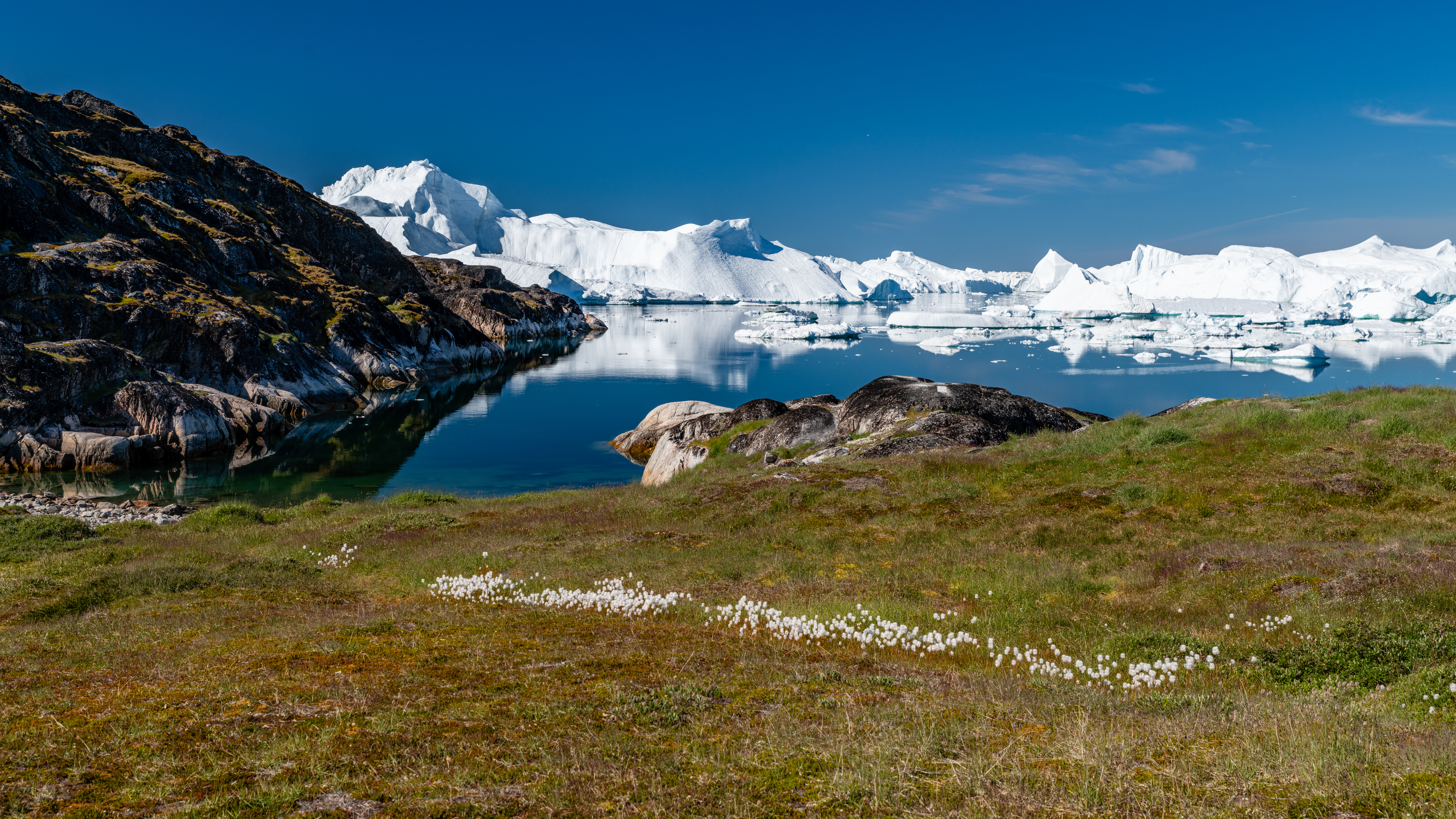
Jakobshavn icefjord in West Greenland, one of the places Kolbert visited on her travels

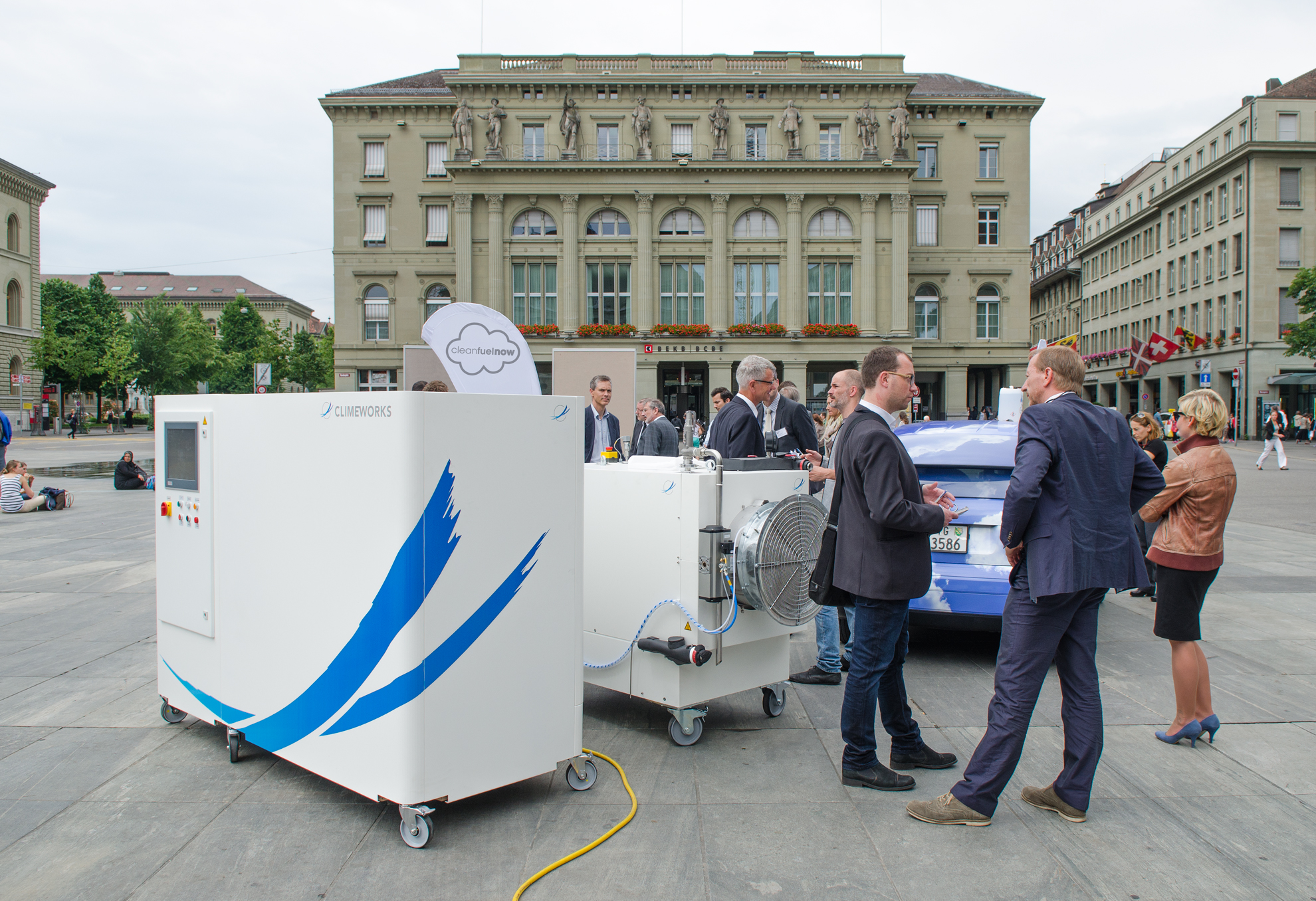
Climeworks, one of the companies Kolbert visited while writing Under a White Sky

Elizabeth Kolbert started working for The New York Times as a stringer in Germany in 1983. "I’d worked on the high-school paper; I’d worked on the college paper. I’ve always been attracted to journalism. And I wrote a bunch of stuff that actually made it into the travel section of The New York Times. And then I came back and got a really entry-level job." In 1985, she went to work for the Metro desk. Kolbert served as the Times' Albany bureau chief from 1988 to 1991 and wrote the Metro Matters column from 1997 to 1998. She published several profiles in the New York Times magazine on figures such as former Governor Mario M. Cuomo and former U.S. Senator Alfonse D’Amato.

Since 1999, she has been a staff writer for The New Yorker. In her early years at the magazine, she wrote a column about New York politics, “Around City Hall.” Her work from this period was collected in the book The Prophet of Love: And Other Tales of Power and Deceit, published in 2004. While on the staff of The New Yorker, Kolbert wrote several profiles, including pieces on Hillary Clinton, Rudolph Giuliani, and Michael Bloomberg.

In 2005, Kolbert published a three-part series in The New Yorker on climate change. The series, "The Climate of Man," won a National Magazine Award for Public Interest. It became the basis of Kolbert’s second book, Field Notes from a Catastrophe: Man, Nature, and Climate Change, which came out in 2006.

Kolbert served as the editor for The Best American Science and Nature Writing 2009. In 2014, her book The Sixth Extinction introduced the concept of a human-caused mass extinction to a general audience. The New York Times named it one of the ten best books of the year, and it won the 2015 Pulitzer Prize for General Nonfiction. Her 2021 book Under a White Sky explored “the spiralling absurdity of human attempts to control nature with technology.” Kolbert published an alphabet book about climate change called H is for Hope: Climate Change from A to Z in 2024. The book was illustrated by Wesley Allsbrook. Her latest book, Life on a Little-Known Planet: Dispatches from a Changing World, came out in 2025.

Kolbert’s writing has won many awards, including a National Academies Communication Award, a Heinz Award, and the BBVA Foundation’s Biophilia Award for Environmental Communication.

== Books ==
The Prophet of Love: And Other Tales of Power and Deceit was published by Bloomsbury Publishing in 2004. The book is a collection of articles about New York politics and public figures such as Hillary Clinton, Rudy Giuliani, and Rev. Al Sharpton. All but one of the articles were originally published in The New Yorker.

Field Notes from a Catastrophe: Man, Nature, and Climate Change was published by Bloomsbury Publishing in 2006. This book was one of Kolbert’s first major publications focusing on climate change and the environment. Field Notes from a Catastrophe: Man, Nature, and Climate Change was noted as one of The New York Times 100 Notable Books of the year in 2006. In the book, Kolbert travels around the world to document how climate change is significantly affecting the environment and make these scientific developments accessible to a wide audience. In her writing Kolbert uses contrast to emphasize the severity of our ecological crisis and discusses ancient civilizations as a parallel to our modern world.

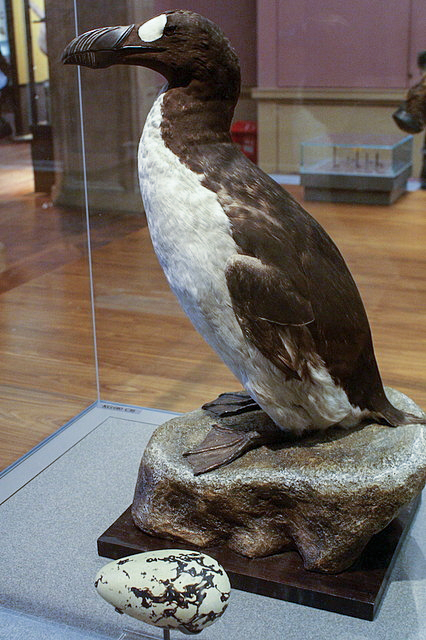
The now extinct Great Auk

The Sixth Extinction: An Unnatural History was published in 2014 and was Kolbert’s breakthrough in the writing and journalism world.

The Sixth Extinction: An Unnatural History argues that the Earth is in the midst of a modern, man-made, sixth extinction. In the book, Kolbert chronicles previous mass extinction events and compares them to the accelerated, widespread extinctions during our present time. She also describes specific species extinguished by humans, as well as the ecologies surrounding prehistoric and near-present extinction events. The target audience is the general reader, and scientific descriptions are rendered in understandable prose. The New York Times named it one of the ten best books of the year, the Guardian named it one of "100 best nonfiction books of all time," and it won the 2015 Pulitzer Prize for General Nonfiction.

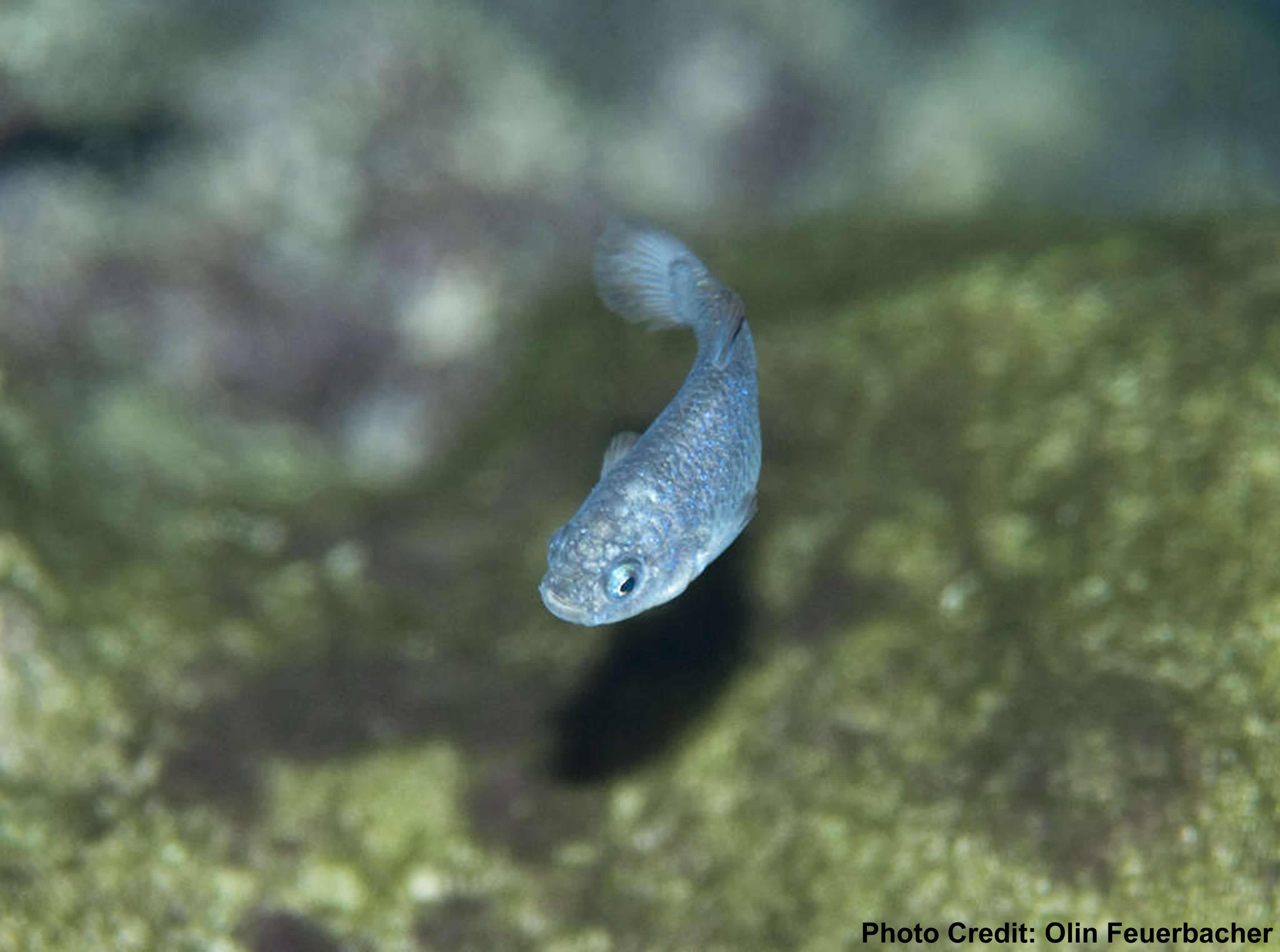
Devil's Hole Pupfish

Under a White Sky: The Nature of the Future focuses on the various kinds of environmental crises created by the Anthropocene and different degrees of technological solutions available to humanity to address them. Nevertheless, the book is also critical of full-blown techno-solutionism. The title refers to the most extreme climate change mitigation strategy, solar geoengineering, designed to reflect sunlight from the earth. Throughout the book she explores how a technological fix for one problem can lead to other problems, while acknowledging the important role these technologies might play. During an interview with Red Canary Magazine, discussing Under a White Sky, Kolbert says this when asked how people should think about nature, “I’m really interested in the book in this extraordinary moment that we live in, where it is increasingly difficult to draw the line between humanity and nature, because we’re such a powerful force on planet Earth.”

H is for Hope: Climate Change from A to Z was published in 2024. Illustrated by artist Wesley Allsbrook, the book documents the history of climate change along with our uncertain future in twenty-six essays for each letter of the alphabet.

In an interview with Grist, led by Kate Yoder, when asked about her decision on structure in her book H is for Hope: Climate Change from A to Z, Kolbert stated:

Well, this book is my attempt to do that. I can’t give you the poster child for climate change that’s going to change everyone’s perceptions of it, or the story that’s going to finally cut through all the BS. Many approaches have been taken, some are more successful than others, but we still seem stuck. And I was really trying in this book to get around that problem, or fool around with that problem, that the traditional narratives don’t seem to work.

Kolbert’s most recent book, Life on a Little-Known Planet: Dispatches from a Changing World, published in 2025, brings a lot of Kolbert’s works together. It highlights some of her most impactful writing and articles she’s published throughout the years. Life on a Little-Known Planet was recognized as one of the best books of the year by the Washington Post, Time, Esquire, Smithsonian Magazine, Publishers Weekly, Kirkus Reviews, and Library Journal. The book is a collection of Kolbert's stories on topics ranging from the rights of nature to the "insect apocalypse."

== Personal life ==
Kolbert resides in Williamstown, Massachusetts, with her husband, John Kleiner, and three sons (Ned, Matthew, and Aaron). Kolbert and her husband Kleiner married February 9, 1991 in Albany, New York. Her husband Kleiner graduated from Amherst College with a master’s degree from Cornell in Physics. He works as an English professor.

== Recognition ==
- 2005 American Association for the Advancement of Science Journalism Award
- 2006 National Magazine Award for Public Interest
- 2006 Lannan Literary Fellowship
- 2006 National Academies Communication Award
- 2010 16th Annual Heinz Award with special focus on global change
- 2010 National Magazine Award for Commentary
- 2010 Guggenheim Fellowship in Science Writing
- 2015 Pulitzer Prize for General Nonfiction
- 2016 Sam Rose '58 and Julie Walters Prize at Dickinson College for Environmental Activism
- 2017 SEAL Environmental Journalism Award
- 2017 Blake-Dodd Prize from the American Academy of Arts and Letters
- 2022 BBVA Foundation’s Biophilia Award for Environmental Communication
- 2024 Library Lions Award for outstanding achievements in their respective fields

== Bibliography ==
=== Books ===
- Kolbert, Elizabeth (2004). The prophet of love : and other tales of power and deceit. New York: Bloomsbury.
- — (2006). Field notes from a catastrophe : man, nature, and climate change. New York: Bloomsbury.
- Kolbert, Elizabeth & Francis Spufford, eds. (2007). The ends of the Earth : an anthology of the finest writing on the Arctic and the Antarctic. 1st U.S. ed. New York: Bloomsbury.
- Kolbert, Elizabeth, ed. (2009). The best American science and nature writing 2009. Boston: Houghton Mifflin Harcourt.
- — (2014). The sixth extinction : an unnatural history.
- — (2021). Under a white sky. Penguin Random House.
- Kolbert, Elizabeth; Wesley Allsbrook (2024). H Is for Hope: Climate Change from A to Z. Ten Speed Press. ISBN 9781984863522.
- Kolbert, Elizabeth (2025). Life on a Little-Known Planet: Dispatches from a Changing World. Crown.

=== Essays and reporting ===
- Kolbert, Elizabeth (October 14–21, 2002). "The lost mariner". The Critics. Books. The New Yorker. 78: 206–211.
- — (November 20, 2006). "The darkening sea". Annals of Science. The New Yorker.
- — (March 29, 2010). "Batless". Postcard from Vermont. The New Yorker. 86 (6): 42–43. (Note: On White nose syndrome.)
- — (March 11, 2013). "Up all night : the science of sleeplessness". Modern Life. The New Yorker. 89 (4): 24–27.
- — (October 21, 2013). "Head count : fertilizer, fertility, and the clashes over population growth". The Critics. Books. The New Yorker. 89 (33): 96–99.
- — (December 16, 2013). "The lost world : the mastodon's molars". Annals of Extinction. Part One. The New Yorker. 89 (41): 28–38.
- — (December 23–30, 2013). "the lost world: fossils of the future". Annals of Extinction. Part Two. The New Yorker. 89 (42): 48–56.
- — (March 3, 2014). "Big score : when Mom takes the SAT's". American Chronicles. The New Yorker. 90 (2): 38–41.
- — (April 14, 2014). "Rough forecasts". The Talk of the Town. Comment. The New Yorker. 90 (8): 21–22.
- — (July 28, 2014). "Stone soup". Annals of Alimentation. The New Yorker. 90 (21): 26–29. (Note: The Paleolithic diet.)
- — (August 25, 2014). "Bug bed". The Talk of the Town. Field Studies. The New Yorker. 90 (24): 20. (Note: Beecher's Trilobite Bed.)
- — (December 22–29, 2014). "The big kill : New Zealand's crusade to rid itself of mammals". Annals of Extermination. The New Yorker. 90 (41): 120–126, 128–129.
- — (January 12, 2015). "Civic duty". The Talk of the Town. Postcard from Rome. The New Yorker. 90 (43): 20, 22. (Note: Renzo Piano.)
- — (February 2, 2015). "Such a Stoic : how Seneca became Ancient Rome's philosopher-fixer". The Critics. Books. The New Yorker. 90 (46): 66–69.
- — (February 16, 2015). "The last trial : a great-grandmother, Auschwitz, and the arc of justice". Letter from Berlin. The New Yorker. 91 (1): 24–30.
- — (December 7, 2015). "Unsafe climates". The Talk of the Town. Comment. The New Yorker. 91 (39): 23–24. (Note: Title in the online table of contents is "Paris, Syria, and climate change".)
- — (August 8–15, 2016). "Swords, sandals". The Talk of the Town. The Pictures. The New Yorker. 92 (24): 21–22. (Note: Online version is titled "Morgan Freeman's 'Ben-Hur'".)
- — (October 24, 2016). "Greenland Is Melting". Letter from Greenland. The New Yorker.
- — (December 19–26, 2016). "Rage against the machine : will robots take your job?". The Critics. Books. The New Yorker. 92 (42): 114–118. (Note: Online version is titled "Our automated future".)
- — (February 27, 2017). "That's what you think : why reason and evidence won't change our minds". The Critics. Books. The New Yorker. 93 (2): 66–71. (Note: Online version is titled "Why facts don't change our minds".)
- — (June 19, 2017). "Incident". The Talk of the Town. Art's Sake Dept. The New Yorker. 93 (17): 23. (Note: Online version is titled "James Turrell makes light physical".)
- — (May 20, 2019). "Last chances". The Talk of the Town. Comment. The New Yorker. 95 (13): 23–24. (Note: Online version is titled "Climate change and the new age of extinction".)
- — (May 20, 2019). "The ice stupas : artificial glaciers at the edge of the Himalayas". Portfolio. The New Yorker. 95 (13). Photographs by Vasantha Yogananthan: 54–67. (Note: Online version is titled "The art of building artificial glaciers".)
- — (January 13, 2020). "Don't wait". The Talk of the Town. Comment. The New Yorker. 95 (44): 13–14. (Note: Online version is titled "What will another decade of climate crisis bring?".)
- — (July 27, 2020). "The catastrophist : NASA's climate expert delivers the news no wants to know". Profiles. June 29, 2009. The New Yorker. 96 (21): 24–29. (Note: Title in the online table of contents is "The climate expert who delivered news no one wanted to hear". Originally published in the June 29, 2009 issue.)
- — (October 12, 2020). "This close : the day the Cuban missile crisis almost went nuclear". The New Yorker: 70–73. (Note: A review of Martin J. Sherwin's Gambling with armageddon : nuclear roulette from Hiroshima to the Cuban Missile Crisis (New York : Knopf, 2020). Includes information from recently declassified sources.)
- — (January 25, 2021). "Swinging on a star : have signs of intelligent extraterrestrial life been found already?". The Critics. Books. The New Yorker. 96 (45): 60–64. (Note: Online version is titled "Have we already been visited by aliens?".)
- — (June 21, 2021). "The deep : when we mine rare metals from the ocean floor, what other riches will be lost?". The Critics. Books. The New Yorker. 97 (17): 58–62. (Note: Online version is titled "The deep sea is filled with treasure, but it comes at a price".)
- Elizabeth Kolbert, "The Waste Land" (review of Lina Zeldovich, The Other Dark Matter: The Science and Business of Turning Waste into Wealth and Health, University of Chicago Press, 259 pp.; and Jo Handelsman, A World Without Soil: The Past, Present, and Precarious Future of the Earth Beneath Our Feet, Yale University Press, 262 pp.), The New York Review of Books, vol. LXIX, no. 3 (24 February 2022), pp. 4, 6.
- — (August 22, 2022). "The political climate". The Talk of the Town. Comment. The New Yorker. 98 (25): 11–12. (Note: Online version is titled "How did fighting climate change become a partisan issue?".)
- — (March 20, 2023). "A Little-Known Planet: An entomologist races to find caterpillars before they disappear". Annals of Science. The New Yorker. 99 (5): 40–47. (Note: Online version is titled "The Little-Known World of Caterpillars".)
- — (July 3, 2023). "A trillion little pieces : how plastics are poisoning us". Annals of Science. The New Yorker. 99 (19): 24–27. (Note: Online version is titled "How plastics are poisoning us".)
- Elizabeth Kolbert, "Spored to Death" (review of Emily Monosson, Blight: Fungi and the Coming Pandemic, Norton, 253 pp.; and Alison Pouliot, Meetings with Remarkable Mushrooms: Forays with Fungi Across Hemispheres, University of Chicago Press, 278 pp.), The New York Review of Books, vol. LXX, no.14 (21 September 2023), pp. 41–42. "Fungi sicken us and fungi sustain us. In either case, we ignore them at our peril." (p. 42.)
- – (September 4, 2023) “Talk To Me: Can artificial intelligence allow us to speak to another species?”. Annals of Nature. The New Yorker.
- – (October 7, 2024) “When the Arctic Melts: What the fate of Greenland means for the rest of the Earth”. The New Yorker.

=== Introductions, forewords and other contributions ===
- Van Gelder, Gordon, ed. (2011). Welcome to the greenhouse : new science fiction on climate change. Preface by Elizabeth Kolbert. New York: OR Books.

=== Critical studies and reviews of Kolbert's work ===
Field notes from a catastrophe

- Gosnell, Mariana (March 16, 2006). "In epoch of man, Earth takes a beating". The New York Times.

The sixth extinction

- Gore, Al (February 10, 2014). "Without a trace". Book Review. The New York Times.

Under a white sky

- Ehrenreich, Ben (March 26, 2021). "Under a White Sky by Elizabeth Kolbert review – the path to catastrophe". The Guardian.

———————

Bibliography notes

== Essays and reporting ==
- – (October 7, 2024) “When the Arctic Melts: What the fate of Greenland means for the rest of the Earth”. The New Yorker.
- – (September 4, 2023) “Talk To Me: Can artificial intelligence allow us to speak to another species?”. Annals of Nature. The New Yorker.
- – (March 20, 2023) “The Little-Known World of Caterpillars: An entomologist races to find them before they disappear”. Annals of Science. The New Yorker.
- – (April 11, 2022) “A Lake in Florida is Suing to Protect Itself”. American Chronicles. The New Yorker.
- – (November 21, 2022) “Climate Change from A to Z: The stories we tell ourselves about the planet”. Annals of a Warming Planet. The New Yorker.
- – (January 11, 2021) “CRISPR and the Splice to Survive: New gene-editing technology could be used to save species from extinction—or to eliminate them”. The Control of Nature. The New Yorker.
- – (December 15, 2013) “The Lost World”. Annals of Extinction. The New Yorker.
- – (November 8, 2009) “Hosed”. Books. The New Yorker.
- – (May 18, 2009) “The Sixth Extinction?". A Reporter At Large. The New Yorker.
- – (April 18, 2005) "The Climate of Man—I: Disappearing islands, thawing permafrost, melting polar ice. How the earth is changing”. Annals of Science The New Yorker.
