= Attitudinal fix =

An attitudinal fix or attitudinal solution refers to solving a problem or resolving a conflict by bringing about an attitude change. Persuasion, mediation, diplomacy, and consciousness raising campaigns are ways of doing this. Only problems or conflicts which involve feelings, emotions, and associated value judgments—that is attitudes—are amenable to such fixes. Thus engineering problems—ones set entirely in the physical environment and/or involving controlling nature—can not be solved by finding an attitudinal fix: their solution must involve a technological fix. Many problems or conflicts involve both attitudes, values and engineering or technological aspects, and these quite different aspects can interact and be intertwined in complex ways. Here problem solving and conflict resolution can be accomplished by seeking either attitudinal fixes, technological fixes, or a combination of both. Not surprisingly, some people prefer one type of solution over the other. Thus in seeking to end a war, some may prefer a negotiated settlement (an important part of which may rest on attitudinal fixes), whereas others may seek a military solution (built on technological fixes).

== See also ==
- Attitude change
- Attitude (psychology)
- Conflict resolution
- Structural fix
