= The Sixth Extinction: An Unnatural History =

2014 nonfiction book by Elizabeth Kolbert

- Author: Elizabeth Kolbert
- Language: English
- Subject: Conservation science; wildlife; epochs; Holocene extinction; anthropocene; geology; archaeology; biology; zoology; history of mass extinctions
- Genre: Nonfiction popular science
- Published: 2014 (Henry Holt and Company)
- Publication place: United States; United Kingdom
- Media type: Print
- Pages: 319
- ISBN: 978-0-8050-9299-8
- Dewey Decimal: 576.8/4
- LC Class: QE721.2.E97 K65 2014

The Sixth Extinction: An Unnatural History is a 2014 nonfiction book written by Elizabeth Kolbert and published by Henry Holt and Company. The book argues that the Earth is in the midst of a modern, man-made, sixth extinction. In the book, Kolbert chronicles previous mass extinction events, and compares them to the accelerated, widespread extinctions during our present time. She also describes specific species extinguished by humans, as well as the ecologies surrounding prehistoric and near-present extinction events. The author received the Pulitzer Prize for General Nonfiction for the book in 2015.

The target audience is the general reader, and scientific descriptions are rendered in understandable prose. The writing blends explanations of her treks to remote areas with interviews of scientists, researchers, and guides, without advocating a position, in pursuit of objectivity. Hence, the sixth mass extinction theme is applied to flora and fauna existing in diverse habitats, such as the Panamanian rainforest, the Great Barrier Reef, the Andes, Bikini Atoll, city zoos, and the author's own backyard. The book also applies this theme to a number of other habitats and organisms throughout the world. After researching the current mainstream view of the relevant peer-reviewed science, Kolbert estimates flora and fauna loss by the end of the 21st century to be between 20 and 50 percent "of all living species on earth".

== Anthropocene ==
Kolbert equates current, general unawareness of this issue to previous widespread disbelief of it during the centuries preceding the late 1700s; at that time, it was believed that prehistoric mass extinctions had never occurred. It was also believed that there were no natural forces—including biological ones—powerful enough to extinguish species en masse. Likewise, in our own time, the possible finality presented by this issue results in denialism. However, scientific studies have shown that human behavior disrupts Earth's balanced and interconnected systems, "putting our own survival in danger." Consequently, the Earth's systems currently affected are the global atmosphere, the water cycle, the ocean's heat absorption, ocean acidity (and its effect on coral reefs), soil moisture and drought conditions, plant destruction by pests/non-indigenous fauna or heat stress, heat regulation by the Earth's ice, and so on.

The human species contributes to this disruption—even without intending to—because of our innate capabilities to alter the planet at this stage of our cultural evolution; for instance, we now can harness energy from beneath the Earth's surface. Homo sapiens also can adapt relatively quickly to almost any environment on this planet's surface. Other species, however, have a hard time relocating to new, suitable habitats. They are unable to migrate ahead of current rapid ecological changes or are hampered by artificial barriers such as roadways, cityscapes, and suburban sprawl, which increase discontinuity between viable habitats throughout the world.

== Background ==
Elizabeth Kolbert is a science writer for The New Yorker magazine. She is the author of Field Notes from a Catastrophe, as well as several other books. Her writing focuses on the effects of humans and civilization on our planet's ecosystem. Much of her writing involves her experiences of various locations, as noted above. Previously, she was a reporter for The New York Times. Kolbert resides in Williamstown, Massachusetts, with her husband and children, and she writes in her home office across from Mount Greylock in Massachusetts. Kolbert has been interviewed by national news and media organizations.

Kolbert's decision to write this book was influenced by a 2008 Proceedings of the National Academy of Sciences paper, titled, "Are we in the midst of the sixth mass extinction? A view from the world of amphibians". Subsequently, Kolbert wrote an article for The New Yorker, titled (similarly to her eventual book), "The Sixth Extinction?" Researching this article involved amphibian hunting in Panama. She then realized, "I hadn't scratched the surface, that there was a book there."

== Summary of chapters ==
=== Chapter 1: The Sixth Extinction ===
The ancestors of frogs crawled out of water around 400 million years ago. 250 million years ago, frogs were the earliest representation of what would become the modern amphibian orders. Amphibians have been on Earth for longer than mammals or birds; they were even here before dinosaurs. Recently, it has been reported that the extinction rate of frogs is increasing. Based on observed extinction rates far beyond expected background extinction rates, we can predict that an event of a catastrophic nature is headed our way. A decade ago, Panamanian golden frogs were plentiful in numbers and easy to find around Panama. However, within the past couple of years, the frogs started to disappear. Kolbert states that studies by the National Zoological Park in Washington, DC, and a mycologist at the University of Maine, have identified the reason for the increased mortality of Panamanian frogs as a type of Chytrid fungus. However, Chytrid fungi are not naturally found in Panama. This left a puzzling question: how did the fungus get to Panama? Evidence indicates that humans were instrumental in how the fungus traveled. Kolbert uses the frog-fungus relationship as a symbol of how humans are introducing invasive species to various environments, where native species would normally have the proper distribution of alleles for their environment.

=== Chapter 2: The Mastodon's Molars ===
Kolbert explains how fossils of the American mastodon (Mammut americanum) shaped Georges Cuvier's views on catastrophism. According to Cuvier, there was no reason the mastodon should have died out. The mastodon was large enough to avoid predation, had large enough teeth to consume an abrasive diet, and had other phenotypes that should have increased its chances of survival. Cuvier concluded there must have been sudden and violent catastrophes that caused mass extinctions of viable species. Kolbert uses the mastodon as a symbol for the idea that catastrophe is an important mechanism of extinction.

=== Chapter 3: The Original Penguin ===
The great auk was a large flightless bird that lived in the Northern Hemisphere. It had a large, intricately grooved beak. When the first settlers arrived in Iceland, the auk population was probably in the millions. However, the settlers found the auks to be "very good and nourishing meat." They also used their oily bodies for fuel and fish bait, and their feathers for stuffing mattresses. Despite attempts at protecting the species, by 1844, the last auks were killed. Kolbert uses the great auk as a symbol of how human overexploitation of resources is another important mechanism of extinction.

=== Chapter 4: The Luck of the Ammonites ===
Kolbert explains that the main cause of the Cretaceous–Paleogene extinction event was not the impact of the asteroid itself. It was the dust created by the impact. The debris from the impact incinerated anything in its path. She states that it is impossible to estimate the full extent of the various species that died out due to this catastrophe. However, one class of animals we know did die out because of the effects of the asteroid's impact, are the ammonites. Kolbert explains that, even though ammonites were 'fit' for their current environment, a single moment can completely change which traits are advantageous and which are lethal.

=== Chapter 5: Welcome to the Anthropocene ===
Kolbert uses the extinction of graptolites and other clades to explain glaciation as a mechanism for extinction. She then explains how, when carbon dioxide levels in the air are high, there typically is an accompanying increase in temperatures and sea level. Right around the time graptolites became extinct, carbon dioxide levels dropped. Temperatures fell and sea levels plummeted. This caused a change in the chemistry of the ocean, which had a devastating impact on life forms. Kolbert states that human activity has transformed between a third and a half of the land surface on the planet. We have dammed most of the major rivers of the world, increased levels of nitrogen higher than can be fixed naturally by terrestrial ecosystems, used more than half of the world's readily accessible freshwater run-off, removed more than one-third of the primary producers of the oceans' coastal waters and changed the composition of the atmosphere by deforestation and fossil fuel combustion.

=== Chapter 6: The Sea Around Us ===
Since the beginning of the Industrial Revolution, we have seen increasing levels of carbon dioxide in the atmosphere at an alarming rate. Studies show we have added approximately 365 billion tons of it by burning fossil fuels, and an additional 180 billion tons as a result of deforestation. We add another 9 billion tons or so a year, an amount that has been increasing by 6 percent annually. Essentially, we have increased the concentration of carbon dioxide in the air to higher than it has been in the last several million years. Some of this carbon dioxide is being absorbed by our oceans to create carbonic acid. This lowers the pH of our ocean and kills much of our marine life. Kolbert uses the drastic decline in life forms around the Castello Aragonese as a warning sign of what is to come if we continue to increase carbon dioxide levels in the atmosphere.

=== Chapter 7: Dropping Acid ===
Coral reefs support thousands of species by providing food and protection. Subsequently, many species have co-evolved with corals. Due to ocean acidification, corals may become extinct by the end of the century. Before the Industrial Revolution, underwater reefs had an aragonite saturation state between 4 and 5. However, if current emission intensities remain as they are today, by 2060, there will no longer be a region above 3.5. This will lead to an increase in the energy needed for calcification. This extra energy that will eventually be expended on calcification is currently vital to corals, as they use it to recover from being eaten away by marine species and battered by waves. Thus, ocean acidification is a mechanism of extinction.

=== Chapter 8: The Forest and the Trees ===
Global warming is most commonly seen as a threat to cold-loving species. As temperatures rise, the ice at the North Pole and South Pole will melt. Any living thing that depends on the ice will be faced with extreme challenges that could ultimately drive them to extinction. Kolbert points out that the poles are not the only places affected by global warming, and that other areas have much higher latitudinal diversity gradients. She discusses the work of scientists who have used measures of species-area relationships to model the possible effects of global warming. The extent to which species are mobile and can relocate to new areas, in response to shifting climate conditions, is predicted to be a significant factor in possible species extinction. This has particular importance for trees and other plant species. Even more difficult to estimate is the extent to which ecological communities of species will be able to tolerate disruptive changes.

=== Chapter 9: Islands on Dry Land ===
Kolbert points out how everything in life is interconnected, and discusses the importance of patch dynamics. Over time, the fragmentation of environmental areas leads to a decrease in the number of species in an area. This occurs, in part, because the size of such "islands" is too small to support a stable number of species members. Also, smaller populations are more vulnerable to these changing events. In addition, the disconnection of islands makes it more difficult for species to reach and recolonize them. One researcher describes this as "an obstacle course for the dispersal of biodiversity." Kolbert also notes that the habits of many species can be highly specialized to their environment. She explains that one minor change can cause a domino effect in various ecological systems.

=== Chapter 10: The New Pangea ===
Kolbert points out that there is an evolutionary arms race, in which each species must be equipped to defend against their potential predators and need to be more fit than their competition. A species has no defense if it encounters a new fungus, virus, or bacterium. This can be extremely deadly, as it was in the case of the American bats killed by the psychrophilic fungus Geomyces destructans. Another example of this occurred in the 1800s. The American chestnut was the dominant deciduous tree in eastern American forests. Then, a fungus (Cryphonectria parasitica) started to cause chestnut blight. It was nearly 100 percent lethal. This fungus was unintentionally imported to the US by humans. Kolbert then explains that global trade and travel are creating a virtual "Pangaea", in which species of all kinds are being redistributed beyond historical geographic barriers. This furthers the first chapter's idea that invasive species are a mechanism of extinction.

=== Chapter 11: The Rhino Gets an Ultrasound ===
The Sumatran Rhino was once so abundant in numbers it was considered an agricultural pest. However, as Southeast Asia's forests were cut down, the rhino's habitat became fragmented. In the 1900s, the rhino population had shrunk to just a few hundred. A captive breeding program was widely regarded as a failure and resulted in the deaths of several rhinos, and it was decades before a single baby was born. Today, there are only one hundred living Sumatran rhinos. Kolbert uses this rhino species to illustrate habitat fragmentation as another mechanism of extinction.

=== Chapter 12: The Madness Gene ===
Europe was home to the Neanderthals for at least 100,000 years. Then, about 30,000 years ago, the Neanderthals vanished. Fossil records show that modern humans arrived in Europe 40,000 years ago. Within 10,000 years, Neanderthals were bred out. Through molecular sequencing, scientists have found that there is one to four percent Neanderthal DNA in all non-African humans. This indicates that humans and Neanderthals interbred, and the resulting hybrids reproduced. The pattern continued until Neanderthals were literally bred out. Kolbert states there is every reason to believe that Neanderthals would still exist if it weren't for Homo sapiens.

=== Chapter 13: The Things with Feathers ===
Kolbert concludes with hope in humanity, pointing to various efforts to conserve or preserve species. Whether meaning to or not, we are deciding which evolutionary pathways will be shut off forever, and which can be left open to flourish.

== Sources ==
Some sources for the book include The Song of the Dodo by David Quammen, The Ghost With Trembling Wings by Scott Weidensaul, and reports from Edward O. Wilson, a biologist. The pioneering studies of naturalist Georges Cuvier and geologist Charles Lyell are also referenced. The book's title is similar to a 1995 book title, The Sixth Extinction, by Richard Leakey and Roger Lewin. Also included are excerpts from interviews with a forest ecologist, atmospheric scientist Ken Caldeira, wildlife and conservation experts, a modern-day geologist, and fungus researchers in New England and New York State.

== Awards and honors ==
- 2014 National Book Critics Circle Award (General Nonfiction) finalist
- 2014 Library Journal Top Ten Book
- 2015 Massachusetts Book Award, Nonfiction
- 2015 Pulitzer Prize for General Nonfiction

Bill Gates named the book to his 2014 Summer Reading List.

== See also ==
- Endangered species
- EDGE species
- Global catastrophic risk
- IUCN Red List of Threatened Species
- Racing Extinction (documentary film)
