= Situationism (psychology) =

Theory

Under the controversy of person–situation debate, situationism is the theory that changes in human behavior are factors of the situation rather than the traits a person possesses. Behavior is believed to be influenced by external, situational factors rather than internal traits or motivations. Situationism therefore challenges the positions of trait theorists, such as Hans Eysenck or Raymond B. Cattell. This is an ongoing debate that has truth to both sides; psychologists are able to prove each of the view points through human experimentation.

== History and conceptions ==
Situationists believe that thoughts, feelings, dispositions, and past experiences and behaviors do not determine what someone will do in a given situation, rather, the situation itself does. Situationists tend to assume that character traits are distinctive, meaning that they do not completely disregard the idea of traits, but suggest that situations have a greater impact on behavior than those traits. Situationism is also influenced by culture, in that the extent to which people believe that situations impact behaviors varies between cultures. Situationism has been perceived as arising in response to trait theories, and correcting the notion that everything we do is because of our traits. However, situationism has also been criticized for ignoring individuals' inherent influences on behavior. There are many experiments and evidence supporting this topic, and shown in the sources below but also in the article itself. But these experiments do not test what people would do in situations that are forced or rushed, most mistakes are made from rushing and or forgetting something due to lack of concentration. Situationism can be looked at in many different ways, this means that situationism needs to be tested and experimented in many different ways.

== Criticisms for situationism ==
While situationism has become an increasingly popular theory in the field of philosophy, some wonder why it never quite garnered the same attention in the field of psychology. One reason for this could be the criticisms put forth by psychologists who believe that there just because a personality effect does not account for the entirety of an observed behavior, there is no reason to believe that the rest is determined by situational effect. Rather, many psychologists believe that trait-situation interactions are more likely responsible for observed behaviors; that is, we cannot attribute behavior to just personality traits or just situational effects, but rather an interaction between the two processes. Additionally, the popularity of the Big Five-Factor Model of Personality within the field of psychology has overshadowed the theory of situationism. Because this model of personality identifies specific personality traits and claims they can explain behavior and decisions of an individual, situationism has become a bit obsolete.

== Experimental evidence ==
One influential, albeit controversial, study supporting situationism is the 1971 Stanford prison experiment. Stanford psychology professor and lead researcher of the experiment Philip Zimbardo has explicitly endorsed the application of a situationist perspective to the experiment. The study primarily sought to observe the impact of contextual and social forces on behavior and identity, while also countering the popular alternative dispositional hypothesis of human behavior, which the authors believed wrongfully justified the "deplorable condition of [the U.S.] penal system and its dehumanising effects upon prisoners and guards." In this study, college students were randomly assigned to act as guards or prisoners in a simulated prison environment. The guards quickly adopted authoritarian behaviors, and several prisoners experienced emotional distress, leading to the early termination of the experiment. The findings suggested that social roles and situational pressures can strongly influence behavior, independent of individual personality traits. The experiment has since faced criticism regarding its methodology, ethics, and validity, but it remains a key reference in discussions of situational effects on behavior.

Studies investigating bystander effects also support situationism. For example, in 1973, Darley and Batson conducted a study where they asked students at a seminary school to give a presentation in a separate building. They gave each individual participant a topic, and would then tell a participant that they were supposed to be there immediately, or in a few minutes, and sent them on their way to the building. On the way, each participant encountered a confederate who was on the ground, clearly in need of medical attention. Darley and Batson observed that more participants who had extra time stopped to help the confederate than those who were in a hurry. Nearly 63% of those in a low-hurry condition stopped to help, compared with only 10% in the high-hurry condition. Helping was not predicted by religious personality measures, and the results therefore indicate that the situation influenced their behavior.

A third influential study supporting situationism is the Milgram experiment. Conducted by Yale University psychologist Stanley Milgram, the study examined participants' willingness to obey authority figures even when instructed to perform actions conflicting with their personal conscience. Participants believed they were administering increasingly severe electric shocks to a "learner" in a memory test. Although the shocks (and the learners' pained reactions) were simulated, many participants continued to deliver them when prompted by the experimenter, with all reaching at least 300 volts and 65% proceeding to the maximum 450 volts. Milgram designed the study to investigate obedience and the psychological mechanisms underlying acts of genocide and harm. He rejected the view that atrocities such as those of the Holocaust could be sufficiently explained by personality defects alone, arguing instead that ordinary people can act destructively when placed in institutional systems that demand obedience.

=== Contradictory evidence ===
The traditional view of situationism purports that personality traits have a very weak relationship to behavior, while in contrast, situational factors usually have a stronger impact on behavior. Still, other studies demonstrate that contextual factors may supersede situation and personality in their impact on behavior. For example, twin studies have shown that identical twins share more traits than fraternal twins. This might imply that there is a genetic basis for behavior, which might rule out that situation alone determines behavior. Personality itself may also impact situation.

== Current views: interactionism ==
In addition to the debate between trait influences and situational influences on behavior, a psychological model of "interactionism" exists, which is a view that both internal dispositions and external situational factors affect a person's behavior in a given situation. This model emphasizes both sides of the person-situation debate, and says that internal and external factors interact with each other to produce a behavior. Interactionism is currently an accepted personality theory, and there has been sufficient empirical evidence to support interactionism. However, it is also important to note that both situationists and trait theorists contributed to explaining facets of human behavior.

== See also ==
- Trait activation theory
- Philip Zimbardo
