= NFPA 1001 =

NFPA 1001 (Standard for Firefighter Professional Qualifications) is a standard published by the National Fire Protection Association which identifies the minimum job performance requirements (JPRs) for career and volunteer firefighters whose duties are primarily structural in nature.

== Structure ==
The NFPA 1001 is sectioned as follows:

- 1. Administration
- 2. Referenced Publications
- 3. Definitions
- 4. Entrance Requirements
- 5. Fire Fighter I
- 6. Fire Fighter II
