= Typical versus maximum performance =

The distinction between typical and maximum performance is one way to classify job performance in industrial/organizational psychology. Typical performance is how an employee performs on a regular basis, while maximum performance is how one performs when exerting as much effort as possible.

Workers usually exhibit maximum performance when they are being observed. Therefore, some conditions that tend to foster maximum performance include work samples (often given to a potential employee during an interview), manager evaluations, and job knowledge tests. The results from these situations are the ones that are most accessible to supervisors; however, they are usually not reflected in an employee's typical, or day-to-day, performance. This dichotomy makes it harder for managers to have an accurate picture of how an employee will typically act on the job. Therefore, an example of the importance of this distinction can be seen when a manager hires an employee based on high performance during an interview; the manager is essentially hiring the employee based on viewing their maximum performance, which may not be representative of their typical performance. Additionally, this distinction has led some organizations to take measures to get their employees to perform at their maximum level more often.

== Characteristics ==
Psychological tests are broadly divided by the British Psychological Society into the following two types.

1. Test of typical performance. In this case, an individual's performance is assessed according to a given situation. Answers are not right or wrong, but identify choices, preferences and strengths of feeling.
2. Test of maximum performance: These assess the individual's ability to perform effectively under standard conditions. Performance on these tests, which includes ability and aptitude tests, can be judged as right or wrong. Ability tests come in many different forms and may test a general intellectual functioning or a specific ability.

Both typical and maximum performances are characterized by different conditions. Managers and organizations should be aware of these so that they are able to identify whether an employee is performing at a typical or maximum level.

Sackett, Zedeck, and Fogli, the researchers who first studied the typical/maximum distinction in 1988, proposed that several conditions must be present for maximum performance to occur:

a. the individual must be aware that they are being observed;
b. the individual must be instructed to maximize their effort; and
c. the measure of performance must occur over a short period of time so that the individual can remain focused on the appropriate goal.

Alternatively, typical performance would occur in situations where the individual is not aware of evaluation, is not consciously attempting their best performance, and is monitored over a long period of time.

More recently, Sackett elaborated on the definition of maximum performance, saying that one can view it as the level of performance an employee can "produce on demand" if exerting maximum effort for a short period of time. This means that maximum performance cannot be due purely to luck or chance. As an example, he says that when concentrating, he could make 7 of 10 free throws. But, if he has a hot streak and makes 10 baskets in a row, this wouldn't be maximum performance because it was probably just due to luck.

=== Original findings ===
The original research on typical and maximum performance studied supermarket employees scanning items at a cash register. Typical performance was determined by the average number of items scanned and the number of voids per shift. Maximum performance was calculated according to the speed and accuracy of several timed observation periods. The researchers found that those two measures were not statistically related, suggesting that typical and maximum performance are actually distinct categorizations.

== Confirming research ==
Continued support has been found for the typical vs. maximum performance distinction since the initial supermarket study. In one study looking at antecedents of the two types of performance, statistical analyses revealed that typical and maximum performance are conceptually different variables. In addition, other studies have revealed that typical and maximum performances do not share the same antecedents, which suggests that these are two separate forms of performance.

== Components ==
Job performance is viewed as an employee's results, determined by their combined intelligence and motivation. Since motivation is dependent on an individual's choices, one can control the direction, level, and persistence they put into a task. Intelligence, however, is stable and not under personal control.

=== Motivation and intelligence ===
All tasks require some form of ability and motivation; however, Sackett and colleagues hypothesized that the difference between typical and maximum performance is determined by a combination of these two factors. They expected that maximum performance is primarily determined by the intelligence of an individual. Since maximum performance occurs when the individual is highly motivated to perform well, the impact of intelligence is higher under these conditions. Everyone under this condition would be exerting the maximum amount, so the difference between individuals lies in their ability. In typical performance, both intelligence and motivation are thought to influence the quality of an employee's job performance. However, motivation is believed to be the more influential factor in this situation.

Research has investigated the strength of these original theories driving typical and maximum performance. A recent study confirmed Sackett and colleagues' ideas, finding that maximum performance was related to the employee's knowledge of the job (e.g., intelligence), while typical performance was related to persistence, self-efficacy, and other measures of motivation.

== Antecedents ==
Because maximum performance can be misleading, it is important for managers to be able to recognize the antecedents of both maximum and typical performances. This can further allow them to recognize when they are most likely to observe either type of performance.

=== Intelligence ===
Since all individuals in a maximum performance situation are expected to have similarly high levels of motivation, the differences in their performance should be primarily based on the differing ability of each person. Following these thoughts, researchers have hypothesized that intelligence would be predictive of maximum performance. A few studies have supported this thought, finding that intelligence is more highly related with maximum performance than it is typical performance.

=== Personality ===
Researchers have hypothesized that typical performance would be predicted by personality factors, since much of the variability in this type of performance is controlled by an individual and their exertion of effort. Specifically, neuroticism and conscientiousness have been believed to be the personality factors that contribute to motivation, since neuroticism is related to self-esteem and confidence, and conscientiousness is related to perseverance and desire to achieve. This idea has received mixed results in the research. A study by Ployhart and colleagues found that the personality factors of neuroticism and extroversion significantly predicted typical performance, and extroversion and openness significantly predicted maximum performance. This research appears to indicate that personality is predictive of both types of performance. A separate study, however, found slightly different results, concluding that overall personality is more predictive of typical performance, while intelligence is still the best predictor of maximum performance.

=== Honesty ===
Many organizations give tests to potential employees during the interview process to determine their job knowledge, overall intelligence, or honesty, and use these to predict how the employee will perform if hired. Research has touched on how maximum performance can be predicted by these tests. For example, one tool is the integrity test, which is a test that attempts to assess whether potential employees will engage in deviant behavior on the job. Examples of such behavior can range from gossiping about a co-worker to stealing money from the organization. Researchers have linked integrity testing to maximum performance because they hypothesize that integrity levels will determine differences in how individuals perform their job, differences which can affect maximum performance in particular. Results obtained by Ones & Viswesvaran supported the use of integrity testing in predicting maximum performance, but also mentioned that job knowledge tests predicted maximum performance as well. Integrity tests are related to the personality factor of conscientiousness, which, as mentioned previously, has not been shown to be related to maximum performance.

=== Race ===
Research has also investigated racial differences in typical and maximum performance. Traditionally, studies have found that minority groups, specifically African Americans, score lower than Whites on intelligence tests, but that personality tests are less biased when predicting performance. As mentioned previously, typical performance has been linked to personality, and maximum performance has been linked to intelligence. Therefore, researchers expected African Americans to exhibit lower levels of maximum performance than Whites, with both ethnic groups showing similar levels of typical performance. However, a study by DuBois and colleagues found just the opposite. Whites outperformed African Americans when they observed typical performance; whereas, the difference was much less pronounced when they examined maximum performance. While this should not impact selection of employees, managers should be aware of the trend when observing performance.

== Purpose of distinction ==
Distinguishing between typical and maximum performance can have both theoretical implications for researchers and practical purposes for organizations.

=== Academic implications ===
Conceptually, the different types of performance could have different predictors, which will affect research in this domain. For example, many studies have found differences in performance ratings depending on whether the rater is a supervisor or a peer. The typical/maximum distinction could explain this difference if, for instance, supervisors observe more maximum performance while peers observe more typical performance.

=== Practical implications ===
On the practical side, the typical/maximum distinction can be important when organizations hire new employees. For instance, even though many companies intend to evaluate what an individual's typical performance would be when making a hiring decision, often organizations use measures that should be associated with maximum performance. These common evaluations include assessment centers, intelligence tests, and situational interviews.

Very little research has attempted to look at how various selection tools can predict an employee's behavior with regard to typical and maximum performance; however, one recent study did focus on behavior description interviews and situational interviews. Behavior description interviews ask applicants to describe past behavior related to specific aspects of the job, while situational interviews have applicants respond to hypothetical job-related dilemmas. Klehe and Latham found that both the behavior description interview and the situational interview predicted typical performance, and the situational interview also predicted maximum performance. While many researchers have expressed concerns about using these tools to predict typical performance, this study suggests that they may actually be quite useful.

Another practical implication of this distinction is the effect it has on employee compensation. Managers may value typical and maximum performance differently, resulting in different rewards. Research suggests that both typical and maximum predict compensation levels, but organizations should ensure that this is the practice they wish to employ.

== Unanswered questions ==
While there have been advances in typical vs. maximum performance theory since Sackett and colleagues' seminal paper, studies on this topic have been limited and many questions are still unanswered. In focusing on the antecedents of both performance types, conflicting research has prohibited researchers from drawing concrete conclusions as to how to forecast employees' potential performances. Specifically, there has not been consistent support for either personality as an antecedent of typical performance or intelligence as an antecedent of maximum performance. In addition, very few other antecedents have been suggested as relating to either type of performance.

Another unanswered question is the time period that may elapse when studying maximum and typical performance. As mentioned, a requirement of maximum performance is that it must be observed over a "short period of time," whereas typical performance is observed over an extended period of time. However, Sackett and other researchers have left the exact duration requirements vague. Future research could examine where the cutoff point between typical and maximum performance lies.

== Summary ==
The distinction between typical and maximum performance has been evident for the past 20 years. Research shows that employees perform at a higher level when they are being temporarily observed compared to other times. The level of typical performance one will usually exhibit, and the level of maximum performance one can achieve, both seem to have particular antecedents. These may include intelligence, personality, honesty, and race. However, further research is needed to confirm and expand upon these findings.
