= Core self-evaluations =

Self-evaluation of personality traits

Core self-evaluations (CSE) represent a stable personality trait which encompasses an individual's subconscious, fundamental evaluations about themselves, their own abilities and their own control. People who have high core self-evaluations will think positively of themselves and be confident in their own abilities. Conversely, people with low core self-evaluations will have a negative appraisal of themselves and will lack confidence. The concept of core self-evaluations was first examined by Judge, Locke, and Durham (1997) and involves four personality dimensions: locus of control, neuroticism, generalized self-efficacy, and self-esteem. The trait developed as a dispositional predictor of job satisfaction, but has expanded to predict a variety of other outcomes. Core self-evaluations are particularly important because they represent a personality trait that will remain consistent over time. Furthermore, the way in which people appraise themselves using core self-evaluations has the ability to predict positive work outcomes, specifically, job satisfaction and job performance. These relationships have inspired increasing amounts of research on core self-evaluations and suggest valuable implications about the importance this trait may have for organizations.

== Definitions of the four dimensions ==
=== Locus of control ===
The locus of control construct indicates a tendency for individuals to attribute life's events to their own doing or to outside forces beyond their control. There are two basic classifications of locus of control: internals and externals. Internals believe they control their own environment whereas externals believe outside forces control their lives. Those with an internal locus of control are more likely to be satisfied with their job and life because they believe in their own control over the situation.

=== Neuroticism ===
Neuroticism is an enduring tendency to experience unpleasant emotions (e.g., anger, anxiety, depression) easily. Those high in neuroticism react more negatively to stress, are prone to anxiety, and are susceptible to feelings of helplessness. Neuroticism, when examined as part of core self-evaluations, is conceptualized as the opposite of emotional stability (i.e., non-neuroticism). In fact, because neuroticism and emotional stability are simply labels for two sides of the same trait, they are often used interchangeably in literature.

=== Generalized self-efficacy ===
"Generalized self-efficacy", adapted from Albert Bandura's original definition of self-efficacy, is defined as an individual's estimate of his or her own ability to perform well and handle a variety of situations. Although an individual can differ in levels of self-efficacy across different domains, generalized self-efficacy is the global estimate of ability across a wide range of situations, and can be considered a stable trait. Individuals high in generalized self-efficacy are more likely to take on new tasks that allow for growth in their ability and are more persistent than those low in generalized self-efficacy.

=== Self-esteem ===
Self-esteem reflects a person's overall appraisal of his or her own worth. Self-esteem may, in fact, be one of the most essential core self-evaluation domains because it is the overall value one places on oneself as a person.

== Development of the construct ==
The core self-evaluation trait was developed through the study of job satisfaction. Historically, three models have been used to study job satisfaction.

- The situational/job characteristics approach, which attributes job satisfaction to external factors such as the characteristics of the job itself,
- The dispositional approach, which attributes job satisfaction to internal, stable personality traits, and
- The interactionist approach, which attributes job satisfaction to an interaction between situational and dispositional factors.

The situational and interactionist approaches had received the majority of the support in previous literature. Acknowledging this disparity, core self-evaluations were developed in an effort to increase exploration of the dispositional approach to job satisfaction.

=== Selection of the core self-evaluation traits ===
While investigating the dispositional model, Judge et al. (1997) reasoned that the traits most likely to predict job satisfaction would maintain three important characteristics: evaluation-focused, fundamental, and large in scope.

1. Evaluation-focused: An evaluative trait involves a fundamental value judgment about oneself, rather than a simple description ("I am confident and worthy," vs. "I am ambitious"). Job satisfaction is itself an evaluation that people make about their jobs; therefore, an individual's evaluations, especially those regarding how they think of and value themselves, should have a large effect on their job satisfaction.
2. Fundamental: A fundamental trait, also called a source trait, is one that is basic and underlying. Fundamental traits together cause broader "surface" traits, and affect all other more specific evaluations. For example, self-doubt and frustration are considered to be source traits that commonly predict the surface trait of aggression. Fundamental traits will have a stronger and more consistent effect on job satisfaction than surface traits.
3. Large in scope: A trait that is large in scope, or global, will more likely generalize to the workplace than a specific trait will. For example, a global evaluation of one's worth will better predict overall job satisfaction than a specific evaluation of one's artistic ability.

Using the above characteristics, four well-studied personality traits; locus of control, neuroticism, generalized self-efficacy, and self-esteem, were chosen as possible dispositional predictors of job satisfaction. Each trait had previously presented as a relatively powerful predictor of various job outcomes; however, until this time, these traits' predictive powers had only been studied in isolation. When studied together, Judge et al. (1997) discovered that these four traits would form a broader personality trait called core self-evaluations, which could predict job satisfaction better than each trait could when examined alone. In other words, relative levels of each of these four traits in an individual can be explained by one broad underlying trait; core self-evaluations. Furthermore, combining these traits allowed for better prediction of job satisfaction, and later, a variety of other outcomes.

=== Relationship between the traits ===
Locus of control, neuroticism, generalized self-efficacy, and self-esteem have many conceptual similarities, but beyond stating that the similarities exist, these traits were rarely studied together until their integration into the common underlying trait of core self-evaluations. Many researchers of personality psychology argue that specific traits have been proposed and studied without considering that these traits have a broad, common core. Many such traits correlate so highly that they should be considered measures of the same construct, which is the case with the four traits of core self-evaluations. These traits are very closely related, and each one only predicts a small portion of job satisfaction by itself. However, when combined into one core trait (i.e., core-self evaluations), their predictive power increases.

=== Comparisons with the Five-Factor Model and positive/negative affectivity ===
The core self-evaluations trait has proven to be a valuable dispositional predictor of job satisfaction, demonstrating stronger predictive power than the Big Five personality traits or Positive/Negative Affectivity.

==== Five-Factor Model ("Big Five personality traits") ====
There is skepticism that core self-evaluations contribute any predictive value above what the Big Five personality traits – (agreeableness, conscientiousness, extraversion, neuroticism, openness) – can predict. Some argue that trait indicators of core self-evaluations are the same as various conceptualizations of the neuroticism component of the Big Five. Although it is true that some definitions of neuroticism include all four CSE traits, the Big Five does not refer explicitly to self-esteem in the description of neuroticism, nor is self-esteem one of the facets of neuroticism in their model. Therefore, the conceptualization of neuroticism in the Big Five is narrower than in core self-evaluations. Additionally, no existing neuroticism scales measure self-esteem. Furthermore, measures of neuroticism include only descriptive questions and lack an evaluative component.

==== Positive/negative affectivity (PA/NA) ====
Affective disposition, the tendency to primarily experience either positive or negative emotional states, has frequently been studied as a correlate of job satisfaction. Although affective disposition does influence job satisfaction, a measure of positive or negative affectivity does not explain unique variance in job satisfaction beyond that explained by the individual core self-evaluations of self-esteem and neuroticism. In fact, measures of core self-evaluations explain significant variance in job and life satisfaction not explained by the PA/NA scales.

== Measurement ==
Previously, attempts to measure the CSE trait were indirect, requiring the trait to be extracted from the four scales that measured each trait. However, a direct core self-evaluation scale, the CSES, has recently been developed and proven both reliable and valid. Although some researchers still favor using the individual trait scales to measure core self-evaluations, the use of the direct measure is growing more popular in recent literature.

There are several reasons the previous indirect measurement of the CSE trait was considered a limitation of CSE research:

1. Length: Direct scales are able to measure the underlying trait in fewer items.
2. Validity: Direct scales are likely to be more valid because they are designed to measure the underlying trait itself rather than indicators of the trait.
3. Consistency: Most traits in contemporary personality research are measured with relatively short, direct scales.

=== The core self-evaluations scale (CSES) ===
The CSES consists of 12 items, and uses a five-point Likert scale (i.e., strongly disagree, disagree, neutral, agree, strongly agree) to score responses. Sample items are below:

- "I am confident I get the success I deserve in life."
- "Sometimes I feel depressed."
- "Sometimes when I fail I feel worthless."
- "I am filled with doubts about my competence.
- "I determine what will happen in my life."

== Outcomes ==
=== Job satisfaction ===
One of the more consistent and significant relationships that has been examined in the literature is the relationship between core self-evaluations and job satisfaction. In fact, when Judge et al. (1997) developed the construct of core self-evaluations, they did so in an effort to identify a valid dispositional predictor of job satisfaction. Since the creation of this construct in the Judge et al. (1997) study, research has continued to support the relationship between core self-evaluations and job satisfaction, which suggests that people who appraise themselves positively (i.e., rate themselves highly on core self-evaluations) are more likely to be satisfied with their jobs. Additional research has also confirmed that CSE traits can predict job satisfaction over time. People who have positive core-self evaluations are likely to be satisfied with their jobs throughout the duration of their lives spent in the work environment.

Job satisfaction is an outcome of core self-evaluations that has become well-established throughout psychological literature. However, Judge et al. (1997) suggest that researchers investigate other variables that may influence this relationship. In response, subsequent literature began to examine the influence of a variety of other constructs on the relationship between core self-evaluations and job satisfaction.

==== Role of perceived job characteristics ====
Job characteristics are attributes of the job that people traditionally find important, including the extent to which they identify with the tasks they are doing (identity), the extent to which they are assigned diverse tasks (variety), extent to which they feel their work affects others (significance), extent to which they receive productive feedback from their job (feedback), and the extent to which they feel they are allowed to make their own decisions at their job (autonomy). These characteristics play an important role in influencing the relationship between an individual's core self-evaluations and their satisfaction with their job. Studies have found that perceived job characteristics partially mediate the relationship between core self-evaluations and job satisfaction. In other words, a person who appraises themselves positively (i.e., has high core self-evaluations) and has acquired a job that encompasses the aforementioned characteristics of identity, variety, significance, feedback, and autonomy, will be more likely to be satisfied with the job.

There have been various theoretical explanations for this mediation relationship addressed in the literature. Primarily, it is suggested that the relationship between core self-evaluations, job characteristics, and, thus, job satisfaction can be explained by two possible mediation models. The first model, known as the action mediation model, suggests that individuals' respective levels of core self-evaluations influence the actions they take to obtain work with the proper job characteristics. According to this model, those with high core-self evaluations will be more likely to seek out job environments that allow them to make positive conclusions about their work. In other words, those who have positive appraisals of themselves (i.e. high core self-evaluations) will be more likely to search for and obtain jobs that have the necessary job characteristics and will consequently have high job satisfaction. The action mediation model also explains that an individual high in core self-evaluations may take more action to alter the characteristics of a job he or she has already obtained. For example, high core self-evaluation individuals may be more likely to seek feedback than low core self-evaluation individuals and, thus, will perceive higher levels of feedback at their job and higher job satisfaction.

The second model, the perception mediation model, suggests that individuals with high core self-evaluations will be more likely to perceive higher levels of the appropriate job characteristics than individuals with low core self-evaluations. For example, those low in the CSE trait will likely perceive less job autonomy and thus, have lower job satisfaction because they believe outside forces control their lives. On the other hand, those high in the CSE trait will likely perceive higher job autonomy because they believe they control their own environment and will, consequently, also perceive higher job satisfaction.

Lastly, a 2009 study by Stummp et al. expands on previous research of the core self-evaluation, job characteristic, and job satisfaction mediation relationship by examining which job characteristic is most important for this link. This study found that task significance had the strongest influence on the relationship between core self-evaluations and job satisfaction. Using the perception mediation model, this suggests that people high in core self-evaluations will perceive their job as more important to others and, therefore, will be more satisfied. On the other hand, this study acknowledged that another explanation could be that those with high core self-evaluations are confident in their actions and will seek out more ambitious goals, which will lead to higher perceived meaningfulness, and later, higher job satisfaction. This is the explanation the action mediation model would suggest. More than likely, it is a combination of the two models that explains the role of job characteristics in the relationship between core self-evaluations and job satisfaction.

==== Role of job complexity ====
The job characteristic studies primarily focus on perceived job characteristics, which are measured subjectively. Nevertheless, it has also been shown that objective measures of job characteristics, such as how challenging a job is (i.e., job complexity) can also influence the relationship between core self-evaluations and job satisfaction. Specifically, job complexity partially mediates the relationship between core self-evaluations and job satisfaction, such that a high CSE individual with a complex job will be more likely to be satisfied with their job. Similar to job characteristics, there is more than one explanation for this relationship. It could be that people high in core self-evaluation are attracted to more complex jobs because they see an opportunity for greater intrinsic rewards. However, it could also be the case that those with high core self-evaluations simply perceive higher complexity in their jobs. Judge et al. (2000) measured job complexity using job titles and confirmed both of these explanations; finding that individuals with high core self-evaluations not only perceived higher job complexity, but were also more likely to hold complex jobs, which led to higher job satisfaction.

==== Role of goal congruence ====
Goal congruence also plays a role in influencing the relationship between one's core self-evaluations and the satisfaction one has with one's job. The theory behind goal congruence argues that people who choose self-concordant (i.e., congruent) goals will be happier with the goals they pursue, be more likely to put in effort towards achieving these goals, and, consequently, will be more likely to attain their goals. Self-concordant goals include goals that focus on intrinsic factors. For example, a person pursuing a self-concordant goal will choose a goal that they feel is personally important, and that they will enjoy. Social goals can be linked to helping individuals create reasonable job satisfaction. Good social goals such as accessible location, good support, good well-being, good rewards, convenience, and equipped resources are linked to increased job satisfaction. An increased satisfaction from the individual can be linked to further productivity for an organisation. On the other hand, goals that are non-self-concordant will focus on more external factors. A person who chooses a non-self-concordant goal will focus on avoiding negative emotions (e.g., anxiety or guilt), satisfying someone else's wishes, or on external rewards, like money. Judge, Bono, Erez, and Locke (2005) found that goal congruence, or choosing self-concordant goals, partially mediates the relationship between core self-evaluations and job satisfaction. The authors explain that individuals with positive self-regard (i.e. high core self-evaluations) believe themselves to be capable and competent and will be less likely to be affected by external factors; thus, they will be more likely to choose self-concordant goals, which will lead to higher satisfaction. On the other hand, individuals with negative self- regard will be susceptible to external factors like anxiety and guilt. These people will be more likely to pursue non-self-concordant goals and will report lower job satisfaction.

=== Job performance ===
Job performance is another consistent and important outcome of core-self evaluations. Many theories have developed regarding how the CSE trait is related to job performance; the most popular of these theories argues that people with high core self-evaluations will be more motivated to perform well because they are confident they have the ability to do so. Another theory suggests that the link between core self-evaluations and performance can be attributed to supervisors enjoying the positivity of high CSE individuals and, thus, rating them highly on performance measures. Lastly, literature has argued that high CSE could be an ability factor. This last theory stems from intuitions made about core self-evaluations from previous connections found in the literature. For example, literature has connected the construct of positive self-concept, an idea similar to core self-evaluations, to the ability to cope well with organizational change. Furthermore, individual core self-evaluation traits like emotional stability have been linked to job performance in team settings (Mount, Barrick, & Stewart, 1995 as cited in). Finally, it is suggested that those with a positive self-concept will be likely to perform well in customer service settings due to their positive emotional displays. These findings support the possibility that high core self-evaluations could indicate a person who has the ability to cope well with organizational change, to work well in groups, and to display positive emotions, all of which contribute to better performance.

==== Role of motivation ====
Despite the variety of theories, motivation is generally the most accepted mediator of the core self-evaluations and job performance relationship. Previous literature suggests that those with negative self-appraisals (low CSE) will see a difficult task and determine that it is beyond their capabilities or out of their control, thus unmanageable. This will lead to low motivation and, consequently, poor performance. High CSE individuals, on the other hand, will be highly motivated to complete challenging tasks because they believe they have the ability and control to complete the tasks successfully. Consequently, high CSE individuals with high motivation will be more likely to perform better in their jobs than low CSE individuals.

=== Life satisfaction ===
A majority of the literature that examines core self-evaluations and job satisfaction also examines how both of these constructs relate to a person's overall life satisfaction. Consistently, it has been found that people with high core self-evaluations are more likely to be satisfied with their jobs and with their lives in general than those who have low core self-evaluations.

=== Job stress ===
Individuals who appraise themselves positively (i.e., have high core self-evaluations) are more likely to cope actively with job stress situations. They are more likely to try to alter the situation than to let the stress affect them. In other words, high CSE individuals will perceive less job stress than low core self-evaluation individuals.

=== Job burnout ===
Job burnout stems from stress at work. A person suffering from burnout is exhausted, cynical, and lacks motivation. Similar to job stress, job burnout has also been related to the core self-evaluations construct. Individuals with low core self-evaluations will consistently feel that they are unable to handle work tasks because they lack the ability or control. For this reason, those with low core self-evaluations will be more susceptible to job burnout than those with high core self-evaluations, who appraise themselves positively and have confidence in their ability to manage the situation. This is particularly important because of job burnout's consistent relationship with voluntary turnover behavior (e.g., individuals choosing to leave the job), which is very costly for all organizations.

=== Economic success ===
Judge and Hurst (2007) conducted a longitudinal study that assessed core self-evaluations in relation to income level in individuals as young adults and later as they entered mid-life. The authors found that core self-evaluations have a positive relationship with income level. In other words, individuals with high core self-evaluations will be more likely to obtain higher levels of income. This could be because those high in the CSE trait seek out better jobs, which offer opportunities for upward mobility and thus, higher income. The effect could also occur as a function of the relationship between core self-evaluations, motivation, and performance. High core self-evaluations are indicative of a person who will be highly motivated to perform competently, which will lead to better performance, and later, perhaps, a higher salary.

Furthermore, the authors assessed the role core self-evaluations may play in moderating the established relationship between family socioeconomic status and an individual's academic achievement as predictors of economic success later in life. Previous literature has confirmed that if you grow up in an affluent family and have a higher degree of education, then you will be more economically successful. Judge and Hurst (2007) found that core self-evaluations could strengthen this relationship. In other words, an individual high in core self-evaluations will be more likely to capitalize on the advantages given to them via their family's economic success or through their own academic achievements and will consequently be more likely to be financially successful later on in life. The authors explain that individuals high in core self-evaluations cope better with events and situations they encounter in life and are motivated to consistently increase their performance and thus, are more likely to capitalize on the educational and financial advantages they already possess in young adulthood. This will allow them to have greater economic success, as measured by their income, in midlife.

== New directions/developments ==
In the most recent literature, core self-evaluations have been linked to various outcomes.

The CSE trait was found to positively influence older adults' participation in progressive resistance training, which is a type of strength training.

Women raised with an authoritarian parenting style developed negative core self-evaluations, which caused them greater difficulty in making a career decision later in life. High CSE relates positively to vocational identity (i.e., commitment and exploration into one's identity as a worker), which is positively related to life satisfaction.

High CSE is associated with lower levels of emotional exhaustion and cynicism, both of which are related to job satisfaction. Those with high CSE tend to perceive and seek out greater levels of support, allowing them to effectively manage multiple life roles (e.g., their role at home, their role at work, etc.). Even when perceived organizational support is low, individuals with high CSE reported feeling higher work-family enrichment (i.e., events in one role, whether they be work or family related, enhance quality of life in the other) than those with low CSE. Similarly, higher levels of CSE correlate negatively with work-school conflict and positively with work-school enrichment.

High levels of subordinate and leader CSE increase the subordinate's role clarity (i.e., understanding of job responsibilities and organizational role), which in turn leads to more positive leader-member exchanges (i.e., interactions between leaders and members). High levels of CSE also enhance team social networks, which in turn increase team effectiveness. Along with conscientiousness, high CSE predicted a more positive judgment of team effectiveness and ability (i.e., high collective efficacy), which in turn leads to improved performance management team behavior (e.g., establishing team goals, coordinating tasks, monitoring progress toward goals).

== Practical implications ==
Core self-evaluations have primarily been studied with two of the most important work outcomes: job satisfaction and job performance. Due to the consistent relationships between core self-evaluations and these outcomes found in the literature, it is important to examine the implications these findings have on the use of core self-evaluation measures in an applied business setting.

=== Personnel selection ===
Personnel selection is the process an organization uses to choose the appropriate individual to hire for a job position. Due to its direct relationship to job satisfaction and job performance, it seems logical that core self-evaluations should be included in personnel selection methods. In fact, researchers do support this idea to an extent. Below are the advantages and disadvantages of using core self-evaluations in selection as suggested by Judge, Erez, & Bono (1998).

==== Advantages ====
1. Provided that all facets of core self-evaluations (i.e., locus of control, emotional stability, generalized self-efficacy, and self-esteem) are included, the measure will remain a valid predictor of job satisfaction and performance.
2. Measures of each core self-evaluation facet are primarily accessible to the public, as opposed to proprietary like the Big Five personality measures.
3. Research reveals no adverse impact of core self-evaluations on minorities or older employees. Adverse impact describes a practice that disproportionally affects members of a minority group. These research findings suggest that core self-evaluation levels do not differ disproportionally in older employees or minority groups, and, thus, will not prevent members of these groups from being selected for a job.

==== Disadvantages ====
1. Core self-evaluations demonstrate a slight to moderate adverse impact on women.
2. The majority of research suggests that applicants do not believe personality measures are relevant for selection. Thus, applicants may not perceive a fair selection system if a personality measure is included.
3. Similar to other personality measures, social desirability, where participants attempt to "fake" or respond with answers which will be viewed favorably by others as opposed to answering honestly, is a disadvantage of using core self-evaluations in selection.

Due to the advantages for employers in employing individuals with high core self-evaluations, more research is necessary to determine the practicality of the core self-evaluation measure as part of a selection method.

== Drawbacks of hyper-CSE ==
Although CSE is generally thought to be a positive trait, hyper-CSE (i.e., very high levels of core self-evaluations) can lead to negative outcomes. Hiller and Hambrick (2005) suggest that hyper-CSE, common in executives, can lead to tainted decision-making (e.g., less comprehensive and more centralized strategic decision-making process, greater organizational persistence in pursuing strategies launched by the executive). Additionally, because those with high core self-evaluations are likely to have more confidence in themselves and believe that they control their own environment, hyper-CSE may also result in overconfidence effect and/or illusion of control.

== Criticisms ==
As research increases on the construct of core self-evaluations, two major criticisms of the trait have developed.

=== Theoretical support ===
The theory behind the core self-evaluations construct is abstract. It posits that a person's own fundamental evaluations can influence most other appraisals they make about themselves and their environment. For this reason, it is difficult to empirically test the CSE trait and its subconscious effect on locus of control, neuroticism, self-esteem, and generalized self-efficacy. Moreover, it is unclear why the CSE theory chose the four dimensions that it encompasses.

- Locus of control was originally not included in the list of traits that would make up core self-evaluations. It was added as a consideration later because "it generally meets the criteria set forth by Judge et al. (1997)" of being a core self-evaluation trait. Later, although some researchers agreed that it was less self-oriented than the other variables because it has an external dimension, it became a part of the theory for two primary reasons: 1) Its scale measured many self-oriented items, and 2) because it was conceptually and empirically related to generalized self-efficacy (a meta-analysis confirms a correlation of .56, one of the lowest correlations between CSE traits).
- Other traits like dispositional optimism, a tendency to believe that things will turn out positively, were also considered but later not included. The reasons behind this decision are not clear, but include the fact that this construct is not as well represented in the literature. It has also been suggested that dispositional optimism may not be distinct from neuroticism or other dispositional traits. Future research should examine the theory more empirically and provide a distinction of how broad, fundamental, and evaluative a trait must be in order to be included in core self-evaluation research.

=== Conceptualization of the trait ===
Previous studies have theorized that CSE is an underlying (i.e., latent) trait that explains the relationship between locus of control, neuroticism, self-efficacy, and self-esteem. However, it has also been suggested that core self-evaluations can be conceptualized as an "aggregate construct," which is composed of or predicted by its four dimensions. In other words, an individual's levels on each of these traits may predict their level of core self-evaluations as opposed to the other way around. This conceptualization difference has important implications for how CSE is measured and, thus, has important implications for the effects found when researching this construct. For this reason, additional research is necessary to examine this conceptualization discrepancy.

== See also ==
- Big Five personality traits
- Negative affectivity
- Positive affectivity
- Job performance
- Job satisfaction
- Life satisfaction
- Locus of Control
- Neuroticism
- Self-efficacy
- Self-esteem
- Illusion of control
- Overconfidence effect
