= Job performance =

Assesses whether a person performs a job well

Job performance assesses whether a person performs a job well. Job performance, studied academically as part of industrial and organizational psychology, also forms a part of human resources management. Performance is an important criterion for organizational outcomes and success. John P. Campbell describes job performance as an individual-level variable, or something a single person does. This differentiates it from more encompassing constructs such as organizational performance or national performance, which are higher-level variables.

== Features ==
There are several key features to Campbell's conceptualization of job performance which help clarify what job performance means.

=== Outcomes ===
First, Campbell defines performance as behavior, which is something done by an employee. This concept differentiates performance from outcomes. Outcomes result partially from an individual's performance, but they are also the result of other influences. In other words, there are more factors that determine outcomes than just an employee's behaviors and actions.

Campbell allows for exceptions when defining performance as behavior. For instance, he clarifies that performance does not have to be directly observable actions of an individual. It can consist of mental productions such as answers or decisions. However, performance needs to be under the individual's control, regardless of whether the performance of interest is mental or behavioral.

The difference between individual controlled action and outcomes is best conveyed through an example. In a sales job, a favorable outcome is a certain level of revenue generated through the sale of something (merchandise, or some service such as insurance). Revenue can be generated or not, depending on the behavior of employees. When the employee performs this sales job well, he is able to move more merchandise. However, certain factors other than employees' behavior influence revenue generated. For example, sales might slump due to economic conditions, changes in customer preferences, production bottlenecks, etc. In these conditions, employee performance can be adequate, yet sales can remain low. The first is performance and the second is the effectiveness of that performance. One can de-couple these two because performance is not the same as effectiveness.

Another closely related construct is productivity. One can think of productivity as a comparison of the amount of effectiveness that results from a certain level of cost associated with that effectiveness. In other words, productivity is the ratio of outputs to inputs—those inputs being effort, monetary costs, resources, etc.

Utility, another related construct, is defined as the value of a particular level of performance, effectiveness, or productivity. Utilities of performance, effectiveness, and productivity are value judgments.

=== Organizational goal relevance ===
Another key feature of job performance is that it has to be goal relevant. Performance must be directed toward organizational goals that are relevant to the job or role. Therefore, performance does not include activities where effort is expended toward achieving peripheral goals. For example, the effort put toward the goal of getting to work in the shortest amount of time is not performance (except where it is concerned with avoiding lateness).

=== Factors ===
Despite the emphasis on defining and predicting job performance, it is not a single unified construct. There are vastly many jobs each with different performance standards. Job performance consists of more than one kind of behavior. Campbell (1990) proposed an eight factor model of performance based on factor analytic research that attempts to capture factors of job performance existent across all jobs.

1. The first factor is task specific behaviors which include those behaviors that an individual undertakes as part of a job. They are the core substantive tasks that delineate one job from another.
2. On the other hand, non-task specific behaviors, the second factor, are those behaviors which an individual is required to undertake which do not pertain only to a particular job. Returning to the sales person, an example of a task specific behavior would be showing a product to a potential customer. A non-task specific behavior of a sales person might be training new staff members.
3. Written and oral communication tasks refer to activities where the incumbent is evaluated, not on the content of a message necessarily, but on the adeptness with which they deliver the communication. Employees need to make formal and informal oral and written presentations to various audiences in many different jobs in the work force.
4. An individual's performance can also be assessed in terms of effort, either day to day, or when there are extraordinary circumstances. This factor reflects the degree to which people commit themselves to job tasks.
5. The performance domain might also include an aspect of personal discipline. Individuals would be expected to be in good standing with the law, not abuse alcohol, etc.
6. In jobs where people work closely or are highly interdependent, performance may include the degree to which a person helps out the groups and his or her colleagues. This might include acting as a good role model, coaching, giving advice or helping maintain group goals.
7. Many jobs also have a supervisory or leadership component. The individual will be relied upon to undertake many of the things delineated under the previous factor and in addition will be responsible for meting out rewards and punishments. These aspects of performance happen in a face to face manner.
8. Managerial and administrative performance entails those aspects of a job which serve the group or organization but do not involve direct supervision. A managerial task would be setting an organizational goal or responding to external stimuli to assist a group in achieving its goals. In addition a manager might be responsible for monitoring group and individual progress towards goals and monitoring organizational resources.

Another taxonomy of job performance was proposed and developed for the US Navy by Murphy (1994). This model is significantly broader and breaks performance into only four dimensions.

1. Task-oriented behaviors are similar to task-specific behaviors in Campbell's model. This dimension includes any major tasks relevant to someone's job.
2. Interpersonally oriented behaviors are represented by any interaction the focal employee has with other employees. These can be task related or non-task related. This dimension diverges from Campbell's taxonomy because it included behaviors (small talk, socializing, etc.) that are not targeting an organization's goal.
3. Down-time behaviors are behaviors that employees engage in during their free time either at work or off-site. Down-time behaviors that occur off-site are only considered job performance when they subsequently affect job performance (for example, outside behaviors that cause absenteeism).
4. Destructive/hazardous behaviors.

In addition to these models dividing performance into dimensions, others have identified different types of behaviors making up performance.

== Types ==
Another way to classify job performance is in terms of task and contextual (citizenship and counterproductive) behaviors. Whereas task performance describes obligatory behaviors, contextual behaviors are behaviors that do not fulfill specific aspects of the job's required role. Citizenship behaviors are defined as behaviors which contribute to the goals of the organization through their effect on the social and psychological conditions. Counterproductive behaviors, on the other hand, are intentional actions by employees which circumvent the aims of the organization.

== Determinants ==
Campbell (1990) also suggested determinants of performance components. Individual differences on performance are a function of three main determinants: declarative knowledge, procedural knowledge and skill, and motivation.

Declarative knowledge represents the knowledge of a given task's requirements. For instance, declarative knowledge includes knowledge of principles, facts, ideas, etc.

If declarative knowledge is knowing what to do, procedural knowledge and skill is knowing how to do it. For example, procedural knowledge and skill includes cognitive skill, perceptual skill, interpersonal skill, etc.

The third predictor of performance is motivation, which refers to "a combined effect from three choice behaviors—choice to expend effort, choice of level of effort to expend, and choice to persist in the expenditure of that level of effort" (Campbell, 1990). It reflects the direction, intensity, and persistence of volitional behaviors. Campbell (1990) emphasized that the only way to discuss motivation as a direct determinant of behavior is as one or more of these choices. (See also Work motivation.)

Campbell (1990) also mentioned several performance parameters that may have important implications for the job performance setting and should be investigated by industrial and organizational psychologists.

The first one is the distinction between speed and accuracy. This distinction is similar to the one between quantity and quality. Important questions that should be considered include: which is most valued by the organization, maximized speed, maximized accuracy, or some balance between the two? What kind of trade offs should an employee makes? The latter question is important because speed and accuracy for the same task may be independent of one another.

The second distinction is between typical and maximum performance. Sackett, Zedeck, and Fogli did a study on supermarket cashiers and found that there was a substantial difference between scores reflecting their typical performance and scores reflecting their maximum performance. This study suggested the distinction between typical and maximum performance. Regular work situations reflect varying levels of motivation which result in typical performance. Special circumstances generate maximum employee motivation which results in maximum performance.

Additionally, the impact of organizational justice perceptions on performance is believed to stem from Equity Theory. This would suggest that when people perceive injustice they seek to restore justice. One way that employees restore justice is by altering their level of performance. Procedural justice affects performance as a result of its impact on employee attitudes. Distributive justice affects performance when efficiency and productivity are involved. Improving justice perceptions improves productivity and performance.

=== Results of personnel psychology ===
A meta-analysis of selection methods in personnel psychology found that general mental ability was the best overall predictor of job performance and training performance. While intelligence (general mental ability) is the strongest known predictor of job performance, that is less true for fields that are information-rich and require much instructional learning. Conscientiousness is another good predictor, but correlates with intelligence and is sometimes excluded from meta-analyses.

The American Psychological Association's Research in Action article on personnel selection recounts evidence indicating that general cognitive ability and conscientiousness account for 20-30% of the variance in job performance, with more complex jobs falling into the upper portion of that range. However, an American Psychological Association article states that conscientiousness actually impedes success in creative, innovative or spontaneous jobs such as artistic, social and investigative jobs. That article states that other psychological factors are also related to job performance, namely: creativity, leadership, integrity, attendance and cooperation.

There are differences in the extent to which job performance is predicted by intelligence depending on the occupation. A 1998 meta-analysis of the predictors of job performance for salesperson found that extraversion and conscientiousness predicted both ratings and sales, but general cognitive ability and age correlated with ratings but not sales. Social skills, a good mentor and interpersonal virtues predict career success, a concept related to job performance, and happiness, better than high education, IQ or cerebral virtues, except for certain occupations like theoretical physics.

=== Impact of work experience ===
The significance of work experience as a predictor of job performance is debatable as experience correlates with performance for people with 0–3 years' experience, but the correlation is attenuating to just 0.15 at 12+ years of experience. This suggests that experience doesn't increase performance after any more than a few years' experience.

=== Detrimental impact of bullying ===
Bullying results in a loss of productivity. In one study a moderate negative correlation was found between self-rated performance and bullying, with the "currently bullied" on average reporting a decrease of productivity of approximately 7% compared with those who were neither bullied nor had witnessed bullying taking place.

== Core self-evaluations ==
Job performance is a consistent and important outcome of core self-evaluations (CSE). The concept of core self-evaluations was first examined by Judge, Locke, and Durham (1997) as a dispositional predictor of job satisfaction, and involves four personality dimensions; locus of control, neuroticism, self-efficacy, and self-esteem. The way in which people appraise themselves using core self-evaluations has the ability to predict positive work outcomes, specifically, job satisfaction and job performance. The most popular theory relating the CSE trait to job performance argues that people with high CSE will be more motivated to perform well because they are confident they have the ability to do so. Motivation is generally the most accepted mediator of the core self-evaluations and job performance relationship. These relationships have inspired increasing amounts of research on core self-evaluations and suggest valuable implications about the importance this trait may have for organizations.

== Role conflict ==
Role conflict can have many different effects on the work-life of an individual as well as their family-life. In a study in Taiwan, it was found that those suffering from role conflict also suffered greatly in their work performance, mainly in the form of lack of motivation. Those with role conflict did not do more than the bare minimum requirements at work. There was also a decline in the ability to assign tasks. Having multiple roles will often lead to job dissatisfaction.

Experiencing role conflict within the work place may also lead to workplace bullying. When companies undergo organizational change workers often experience either a loss or a gain in areas of a workers job, thus changing the expectations of the worker. Change is often very stressful for workers. Workers who might have lost a degree of power may feel like they lost their authority and begin to lash out at other employees by being verbally abusive, purposefully withholding work related items, or sometimes even physically to withhold their status.

While there are many de-motivational effects of role conflict on work, there is also a positive. Those undergoing role conflict often had an increase in work creativity. Due to multiple roles, there is an increase in flexibility, different sources of information, and these people have many different perspectives to bring to the table.

== Emotional intelligence ==
Research of emotional intelligence (EI) and job performance shows mixed results: a positive relation has been found in some of the studies, in others there was no relation or an inconsistent one. This led researchers Cote and Miners (2006) to offer a compensatory model between EI and IQ, that posits that the association between EI and job performance becomes more positive as cognitive intelligence decreases, an idea first proposed in the context of academic performance (Petrides, Frederickson, & Furnham, 2004). The results of the former study supported the compensatory model: employees with low IQ get higher task performance and organizational citizenship behavior directed at the organization, the higher their EI.

A meta-analytic review by Joseph and Newman also revealed that both Ability EI and Trait EI tend to predict job performance much better in jobs that require a high degree of emotional labor (where 'emotional labor' was defined as jobs that require the effective display of positive emotion). In contrast, EI shows little relationship to job performance in jobs that do not require emotional labor. In other words, emotional intelligence tends to predict job performance for emotional jobs only.

A more recent study suggests that EI is not necessarily a universally positive trait. They found a negative correlation between EI and managerial work demands; while under low levels of managerial work demands, they found a negative relationship between EI and teamwork effectiveness. An explanation for this may suggest gender differences in EI, as women tend to score higher levels than men. This furthers the idea that job context plays a role in the relationships between EI, teamwork effectiveness, and job performance.

Another study assessed a possible link between EI and entrepreneurial behaviors and success. In accordance with much of the other findings regarding EI and job performance, they found that levels of EI only predicted a small amount of entrepreneurial behavior.

== See also ==
- Core self-evaluations
- Goal orientation
- High commitment management
- Onboarding
- Organizational commitment
- Performance appraisal
- Typical versus maximum performance
- Trait activation theory
