= Performance domain =

Behaviors conducive to an organization's goals

A performance domain is a construct of all the essential behaviors that should be exhibited by someone on a specific job to achieve the goals set by the organization.

It is determined by the judgments of the decision-makers of the organization after they have conducted a thorough job analysis. It may be thought of as a blueprint, outlining the ideal behaviors that an employee should exhibit on the job. Because the performance domain is subjectively determined, it varies between similar jobs, depending on the goals of the organization.

A performance domain can be constructed to outline all the behaviors and outcomes on a job or only a subset of behaviors and outcomes. Organizations’ analysts can draw from the performance domain to infer personal characteristics that will lead to the essential behaviors and valued outcomes.
